= List of Coleus species =

List of the species of the genus Coleus

Paton et al. (2019) list the following species of Coleus (around 300), many transferred from Plectranthus. As of November 2025, Plants of the World Online accepted 320 species.

== A ==
- Coleus abyssinicus (Fresen.) A.J.Paton
- Coleus acariformis (P.I.Forst.) P.I.Forst.
- Coleus achankoviliensis Smitha & A.J.Paton
- Coleus actites (P.I.Forst.) P.I.Forst.
- Coleus adenanthus (Dalzell & A.Gibson) A.J.Paton
- Coleus adenophorus (Gürke) A.J.Paton
- Coleus aegyptiacus (Forssk.) A.J.Paton
- Coleus affinis (Gürke) A.J.Paton
- Coleus albicalyx (Suddee) Suddee
- Coleus aliciae (Codd) A.J.Paton
- Coleus alloplectus (S.T.Blake) P.I.Forst. & T.C.Wilson
- Coleus alpinus Vatke
- Coleus altanmouiensis (T.C.Wilson, P.I.Forst. & M.A.M.Renner) T.C.Wilson & P.I.Forst.
- Coleus amboinicus Lour.
- Coleus amicorum (S.T.Blake) P.I.Forst. & T.C.Wilson
- Coleus amiculatus (T.C.Wilson, P.I.Forst. & M.A.M.Renner) T.C.Wilson & P.I.Forst.
- Coleus amoenus (P.I.Forst.) P.I.Forst.
- Coleus anamudianus (Smitha & Sunojk.) Smitha
- Coleus angolensis (G.Taylor) A.J.Paton
- Coleus angulatus (Hedge) A.J.Paton & Phillipson
- Coleus anthonyi Jebin Joseph & J.Mathew
- Coleus apoensis Elmer
- Coleus apreptus (S.T.Blake) P.I.Forst. & T.C.Wilson
- Coleus apricus (P.I.Forst.) P.I.Forst.
- Coleus arabicus Benth.
- Coleus arenicola (P.I.Forst.) P.I.Forst.
- Coleus argentatus (S.T.Blake) P.I.Forst. & T.C.Wilson
- Coleus argenteus (Gamble) A.J.Paton
- Coleus argentifolius (Ryding) A.J.Paton
- Coleus articulatus (I.M.Johnst.) A.J.Paton
- Coleus ater A.J.Paton
- Coleus auriglandulosus (A.J.Paton) A.J.Paton
- Coleus australis (R.Br.) A.J.Paton
- Coleus autranii Briq.

== B ==
- Coleus barbatus (Andrews) Benth. ex G.Don
- Coleus bariensis (Ryding) A.J.Paton
- Coleus batesii (Baker) A.J.Paton
- Coleus batianoffii (P.I.Forst.) P.I.Forst.
- Coleus bellus (P.I.Forst.) P.I.Forst.
- Coleus betonicifolius (Baker) A.J.Paton
- Coleus bifidus (A.J.Paton) A.J.Paton
- Coleus bipartitus (P.I.Forst.) P.I.Forst.
- Coleus bishopianus (Gamble) Smitha & A.J.Paton
- Coleus blakei (P.I.Forst.) P.I.Forst.
- Coleus bojeri Benth.
- Coleus bolavenensis Suddee, Tagane & Rueangr.
- Coleus botryosus (A.J.Paton) A.J.Paton
- Coleus bourneae (Gamble) Smitha & A.J.Paton
- Coleus bracteatus Dunn
- Coleus brazzavillensis A.Chev.
- Coleus buchananii (Baker) Brenan
- Coleus burorum Chiov.

== C ==
- Coleus caillei A.Chev. ex Hutch. & Dalziel
- Coleus calaminthoides (Baker) A.J.Paton
- Coleus calcicola Murata
- Coleus caldericola (P.I.Forst.) P.I.Forst.
- Coleus calycinus (Benth.) A.J.Paton
- Coleus cambodianus (Murata) A.J.Paton
- Coleus caninus (B.Heyne ex Roth) Vatke
- Coleus carnosifolius (Hemsl.) Dunn
- Coleus cataractarum (B.J.Pollard) A.J.Paton
- Coleus caudatus (S.Moore) E.Downes & I.Darbysh.
- Coleus celsus A.J.Paton
- Coleus centraliafricanus A.J.Paton
- Coleus chevalieri Briq.
- Coleus ciliatus (Bramley) A.J.Paton
- Coleus circinnatus (Hedge) A.J.Paton & Phillipson
- Coleus coeruleus Gürke
- Coleus comosus Hochst. ex Gürke
- Coleus confertiflorus (A.J.Paton) A.J.Paton
- Coleus congensis (Gürke) A.J.Paton
- Coleus congestus (R.Br.) A.J.Paton
- Coleus conglomeratus (T.C.E.Fr.) Robyns & Lebrun
- Coleus crassus (N.E.Br.) Culham
- Coleus cremnus (B.J.Conn) A.J.Paton
- Coleus cucullatus (A.J.Paton) A.J.Paton
- Coleus cuneatus Baker f.
- Coleus cyanophyllus (P.I.Forst.) P.I.Forst.
- Coleus cylindraceus (Hochst. ex Benth.) A.J.Paton

== D ==
- Coleus daviesii E.A.Bruce
- Coleus decimus (A.J.Paton) A.J.Paton
- Coleus decurrens Gürke
- Coleus deflexifolius (Baker) A.J.Paton
- Coleus defoliatus (Hochst. ex Benth.) A.J.Paton
- Coleus densus (N.E.Br.) A.J.Paton
- Coleus descampsii (Briq.) A.J.Paton
- Coleus dewildemanianus (Robyns & Lebrun) A.J.Paton
- Coleus dichotomus (A.J.Paton) A.J.Paton
- Coleus dinteri (Briq.) A.J.Paton
- Coleus dissitiflorus Gürke
- Coleus divaricatus A.J.Paton
- Coleus diversus (S.T.Blake) P.I.Forst. & T.C.Wilson
- Coleus dolichopodus (Briq.) A.J.Paton
- Coleus dumicola (P.I.Forst.) P.I.Forst.
- Coleus dysophylloides (Benth.) A.J.Paton

== E ==
- Coleus efoliatus De Wild.
- Coleus elliotii (S.Moore) A.J.Paton
- Coleus elongatus Trimen
- Coleus eminii (Gürke) A.J.Paton
- Coleus engleri (Briq.) A.J.Paton
- Coleus erici-rosenii (R.E.Fr.) A.J.Paton
- Coleus esculentus (N.E.Br.) G.Taylor
- Coleus eungellaensis A.J.Paton
- Coleus excelsus (P.I.Forst.) P.I.Forst.
- Coleus exilis (A.J.Paton) A.J.Paton

== F ==
- Coleus fasciculatus (P.I.Forst.) P.I.Forst.
- Coleus ferricola Phillipson, O.Hooper & A.J.Paton
- Coleus foetidus (Benth.) A.J.Paton
- Coleus foliatus (A.J.Paton) A.J.Paton
- Coleus forsteri (Benth.) A.J.Paton
- Coleus fragrantissimus (P.I.Forst.) P.I.Forst.
- Coleus fredericii G.Taylor
- Coleus fruticosus Wight ex Benth.

== G ==
- Coleus galeatus (Vahl) Benth.
- Coleus gamblei (Smitha & Sunojk.) Smitha
- Coleus garckeanus Vatke
- Coleus geminatus (P.I.Forst.) P.I.Forst.
- Coleus gibbosus A.J.Paton
- Coleus gigantifolius (Suddee) Suddee
- Coleus gillettii (J.K.Morton) A.J.Paton
- Coleus glabriflorus (P.I.Forst.) P.I.Forst.
- Coleus globosus (Ryding) A.J.Paton
- Coleus goetzenii (Gürke) A.J.Paton
- Coleus gossweileri A.J.Paton
- Coleus gracilipedicellatus (Robyns & Lebrun) A.J.Paton
- Coleus gracilis Gürke
- Coleus gracillimus (T.C.E.Fr.) Robyns & Lebrun
- Coleus graminifolius (Perkins) A.J.Paton
- Coleus grandicalyx E.A.Bruce
- Coleus grandidentatus (Gürke) A.J.Paton
- Coleus graniticola (A.Chev.) A.J.Paton
- Coleus gratus (S.T.Blake) P.I.Forst. & T.C.Wilson
- Coleus graveolens (R.Br.) A.J.Paton
- Coleus guerkei (Briq.) A.J.Paton
- Coleus gymnostomus Gürke

== H ==
- Coleus habrophyllus (P.I.Forst.) P.I.Forst.
- Coleus hadiensis (Forssk.) A.J.Paton
- Coleus hairulii Kiew
- Coleus hallii (J.K.Morton) A.J.Paton
- Coleus harmandii (Doan ex Suddee & A.J.Paton) A.J.Paton
- Coleus helferi (Hook.f.) A.J.Paton
- Coleus hereroensis (Engl.) A.J.Paton
- Coleus hijazensis (Abdel Khalik) A.J.Paton
- Coleus hildeae Meerts & A.J.Paton
- Coleus humulopsis (B.J.Pollard) A.J.Paton
- Coleus hymalis (J.R.I.Wood) A.J.Paton

== I ==
- Coleus idukkianus (J.Mathew, Yohannan & B.J.Conn) Smitha
- Coleus igniarioides (Ryding) A.J.Paton
- Coleus igniarius Schweinf.
- Coleus ignotus (A.J.Paton) A.J.Paton
- Coleus inflatus Benth.
- Coleus inselbergi (B.J.Pollard & A.J.Paton) A.J.Paton
- Coleus insignis (Hook.f.) A.J.Paton
- Coleus insolitus (C.H.Wright) Robyns & Lebrun
- Coleus insularis (P.I.Forst.) P.I.Forst.
- Coleus intraterraneus (S.T.Blake) P.I.Forst. & T.C.Wilson

== K ==
- Coleus kaminaensis Meerts & A.J.Paton
- Coleus kanneliyensis L.H.Cramer & S. Balas.
- Coleus kanyakumariensis (Shinoj & Sunojk.) Smitha
- Coleus kapatensis R.E.Fr.
- Coleus kirkii (Baker) A.J.Paton
- Coleus kivuensis Lebrun & L.Touss.
- Coleus klossii (S.Moore) P.I.Forst. & T.C.Wilson
- Coleus koualensis A.Chev. ex Hutch. & Dalziel
- Coleus koulikoroensis A.J.Paton
- Coleus kundelunguensis Meerts & A.J.Paton
- Coleus kunstleri (Prain) A.J.Paton

== L ==
- Coleus lactiflorus Vatke
- Coleus laetus (P.I.Forst.) P.I.Forst.
- Coleus lageniocalyx Briq.
- Coleus lanceolatus (Bojer ex Benth.) A.J.Paton & Phillipson
- Coleus lancifolius (Bramley) A.J.Paton
- Coleus lanuginosus Hochst. ex Benth.
- Coleus lasianthus Gürke
- Coleus lateriticola (A.Chev.) Phillipson, O.Hooper & A.J.Paton
- Coleus laxus (T.C.Wilson & P.I.Forst.) T.C.Wilson & P.I.Forst.
- Coleus leemannii (N.Hahn) A.J.Paton
- Coleus leiperi (P.I.Forst.) P.I.Forst.
- Coleus linarioides Meerts & A.J.Paton
- Coleus linearifolius (J.K.Morton) A.J.Paton
- Coleus lisowskii Meerts & A.J.Paton
- Coleus livingstonei A.J.Paton
- Coleus longipetiolatus Gürke
- Coleus lyratus (A.Chev.) Roberty

== M ==
- Coleus maculosus (Lam.) A.J.Paton
- Coleus madagascariensis (Pers.) A.Chev.
- Coleus magnificus P.I.Forst. & A.J.Paton
- Coleus malabaricus Benth.
- Coleus mannii Hook.f.
- Coleus marrubatus (J.K.Morton) A.J.Paton
- Coleus megacalyx (A.J.Paton) A.J.Paton
- Coleus megadontus (P.I.Forst.) P.I.Forst.
- Coleus melleri (Baker) A.J.Paton & Phillipson
- Coleus meyeri (Gürke) A.J.Paton
- Coleus minor (J.K.Morton) A.J.Paton
- Coleus minusculus Meerts & A.J.Paton
- Coleus minutiflorus (Ryding) A.J.Paton
- Coleus minutus (P.I.Forst.) P.I.Forst.
- Coleus mirabilis Briq.
- Coleus mirus (S.T.Blake) P.I.Forst. & T.C.Wilson
- Coleus mitis (R.A.Clement) A.J.Paton
- Coleus mitwabaensis Meerts & A.J.Paton
- Coleus modestus (Baker) Robyns & Lebrun
- Coleus mollis Benth.
- Coleus monostachyus (P.Beauv.) A.J.Paton
- Coleus mutabilis (Codd) A.J.Paton
- Coleus myrianthellus Briq.
- Coleus mystax Meerts & A.J.Paton

== N ==
- Coleus namuliensis E.Downes & I.Darbysh.
- Coleus neochilus (Schltr.) Codd
- Coleus nepetifolius (Baker) A.J.Paton
- Coleus niamniamensis (Gürke) A.J.Paton
- Coleus nigericus (Alston) A.J.Paton
- Coleus nitidus (P.I.Forst.) P.I.Forst.
- Coleus niveus (Hiern) A.J.Paton
- Coleus nyikensis Baker

== O ==
- Coleus omissus (P.I.Forst.) P.I.Forst.
- Coleus orthodontus (Gürke) A.J.Paton
- Coleus otostegioides (Schweinf. ex Gürke) A.J.Paton

== P ==
- Coleus pallidus (Wall. ex Benth.) A.J.Paton
- Coleus paniculatus Benth.
- Coleus parishii (Hook.f.) A.J.Paton
- Coleus parvicalyx (A.J.Paton) A.J.Paton
- Coleus parvifolius (Baker) Meerts & A.J.Paton
- Coleus pengbelensis Meerts & A.J.Paton
- Coleus penicillatus (A.J.Paton) A.J.Paton
- Coleus pentheri Gürke
- Coleus perrieri (Hedge) A.J.Paton & Phillipson
- Coleus persoonii Benth.
- Coleus petiolatissimus Briq.
- Coleus petraeus (Backer ex Adelb.) A.J.Paton
- Coleus petricola (J.Mathew & B.J.Conn) A.J.Paton
- Coleus phulangkaensis (Suddee, Suphuntee & Saengrit) Suddee
- Coleus piscatorum Meerts & A.J.Paton
- Coleus plantagineus (Hook.f.) A.J.Paton
- Coleus platyphyllus (A.J.Paton) A.J.Paton
- Coleus pobeguinii Hutch. & Dalziel
- Coleus polystachyus (Benth.) A.J.Paton
- Coleus porcatus (van Jaarsv. & P.J.D.Winter) A.J.Paton
- Coleus porphyranthus (T.J.Edwards & N.R.Crouch) A.J.Paton
- Coleus prittwitzii (Perkins) A.J.Paton
- Coleus prostratus (Gürke) A.J.Paton
- Coleus psammophilus (Codd) A.J.Paton
- Coleus pseudoschizophyllus Meerts & A.J.Paton
- Coleus pseudospeciosus (Buscal. & Muschl.) A.J.Paton
- Coleus pulchellus (P.I.Forst.) P.I.Forst.
- Coleus pyramidatus (Gürke) K.Balkwill

== R ==
- Coleus rafidahiae Kiew
- Coleus recurvata (Ryding) A.J.Paton
- Coleus repens Gürke
- Coleus reticulatus A.Chev.
- Coleus rhodesianus (N.E.Br.) A.J.Paton
- Coleus robustus (Hook.f.) A.J.Paton
- Coleus rotundifolius (Poir.) A.Chev. & Perrot
- Coleus ruandensis (De Wild.) A.J.Paton
- Coleus rutenbergianus (Vatke) A.J.Paton & Phillipson
- Coleus ruziziensis Meerts & A.J.Paton

== S ==
- Coleus sahyadricus (Smitha & Sunojk.) Smitha
- Coleus sallyae (A.J.Paton) A.J.Paton
- Coleus sanguineus (Britten) A.J.Paton
- Coleus saxorum (J.Mathew, Yohannan & B.J.Conn) Smitha
- Coleus scaber (Benth.) A.J.Paton
- Coleus scandens Gürke
- Coleus scebeli Chiov.
- Coleus schizophyllus (Baker) A.J.Paton
- Coleus schliebenii (Mildbr.) A.J.Paton
- Coleus scopulideorum B.J.Pollard
- Coleus scruposus A.J.Paton
- Coleus scutellarioides (L.) Benth.
- Coleus seretii De Wild.
- Coleus serracafemaensis van Jaarsv. & Swanepoel
- Coleus sessilifolius (A.J.Paton) A.J.Paton
- Coleus shirensis Gürke
- Coleus shoolamudianus (Sunil & Naveen Kum.) Smitha & A.J.Paton
- Coleus sigmoideus (A.J.Paton) A.J.Paton
- Coleus socotranus (Radcl.-Sm.) A.J.Paton
- Coleus sphaerocephalus (Baker) A.J.Paton
- Coleus splendens (P.I.Forst.) P.I.Forst.
- Coleus splendidus A.Chev.
- Coleus stachyoides (Oliv.) E.A.Bruce
- Coleus steenisii (H.Keng) A.J.Paton
- Coleus stenostachys (Baker) A.J.Paton & Phillipson
- Coleus strictipes (G.Taylor) A.J.Paton
- Coleus strobilifer (Roxb.) A.J.Paton
- Coleus stuhlmannii (Gürke) A.J.Paton
- Coleus suaveolens (S.T.Blake) P.I.Forst. & T.C.Wilson
- Coleus subspicatus (Hochst.) Walp.
- Coleus succulentus Pax
- Coleus suffruticosus (Wight) A.J.Paton
- Coleus sylvestris (Gürke) A.J.Paton & Phillipson

== T ==
- Coleus tenuicaulis Hook.f.
- Coleus tetradenifolius (A.J.Paton) A.J.Paton
- Coleus tetragonus (Gürke) Robyns & Lebrun
- Coleus thalassoscopicus (P.I.Forst.) P.I.Forst.
- Coleus thyrsoideus Baker
- Coleus togoensis (Perkins) A.J.Paton
- Coleus tomentifolius (Suddee) Suddee
- Coleus torrenticola (P.I.Forst.) P.I.Forst.
- Coleus triangularis (A.J.Paton) A.J.Paton
- Coleus trullatus (A.J.Paton) A.J.Paton

== U ==
- Coleus umbrosus Vatke
- Coleus unguentarius (Codd) A.J.Paton
- Coleus urticifolius Benth.

== V ==
- Coleus velutinus (Trimen) A.J.Paton
- Coleus venteri (van Jaarsv. & Hankey) A.J.Paton
- Coleus ventosus (P.I.Forst.) P.I.Forst.
- Coleus venustus (P.I.Forst.) P.I.Forst.
- Coleus verticillatus (Baker) A.J.Paton
- Coleus vettiveroides K.C.Jacob
- Coleus veyretiae (Guillaumet & A.Cornet) A.J.Paton & Phillipson
- Coleus villosus (Forssk.) A.J.Paton

== W ==
- Coleus wallamanensis (T.C.Wilson & P.I.Forst.) T.C.Wilson & P.I.Forst.
- Coleus welwitschii Briq.

== X ==
- Coleus xanthanthus C.Y.Wu & Y.C.Huang
- Coleus xerophilus (Codd) A.J.Paton
- Coleus xylopodus (Lukhoba & A.J.Paton) A.J.Paton

== Y ==
- Coleus yemenensis A.J.Paton

== Z ==
- Coleus zigzag Meerts & A.J.Paton
- Coleus zombensis (Baker) Mwany.

== Formerly accepted species ==
- Coleus coerulescens Gürke, synonym of Coleus barbatus var. barbatus
- Coleus macranthus Merr., synonym of Coleus scutellarioides
- Coleus sparsiflorus Elmer, synonym of Coleus galeatus
