= P. canina =

P. canina may refer to:

- Patagonotothen canina, a fish species in the genus Patagonotothen
- Peltigera canina, a lichen species in the genus Peltigera
- "Plectranthus canina", an incorrect name for the plant species Coleus comosus
- Plectranthus caninus, a synonym of the plant species Coleus caninus

== See also ==
- Canina (disambiguation)
