= Solenostemon =

Genus of plants

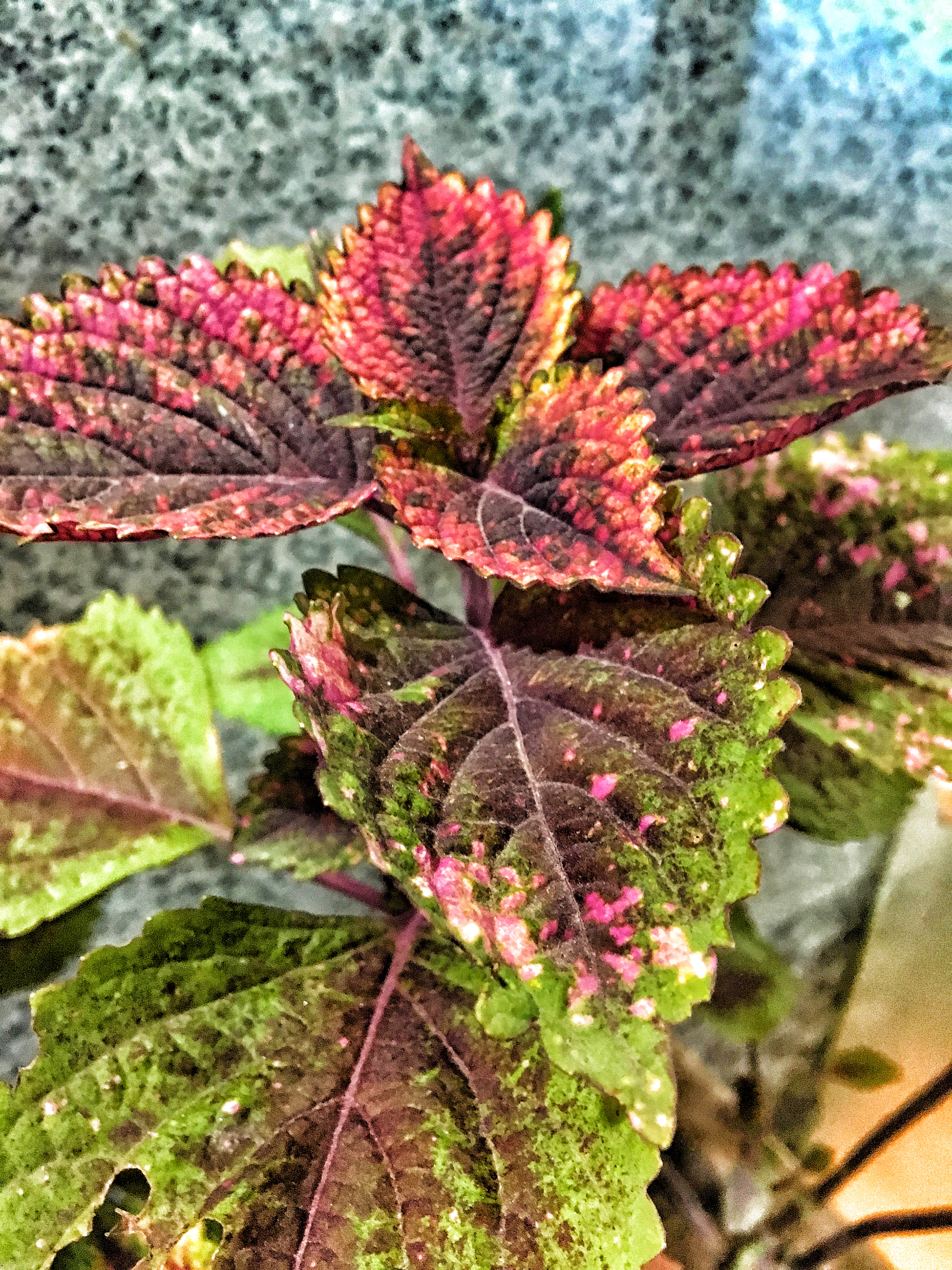
Cultivar of Coleus scutellarioides, formerly Solenostemon scutellarioides

Solenostemon is a former genus of flowering plants in the family Lamiaceae. It has been included in the genus Plectranthus, but is now included in an expanded Coleus. They are native to tropical Africa, Asia and Australia. Some species formerly placed in this genus are cultivated for their highly variegated leaves.

== Former species ==
Some species formerly placed in the genus are:

- Solenostemon autranii (Briq.) J.K.Morton, now Coleus autranii, syn. Plectranthus autranii
- Solenostemon rotundifolius, now Coleus rotundifolius, syn. Plectranthus rotundifolius
- Solenostemon scutellarioides (L.) Codd, now Coleus scutellarioides, syns. Coleus blumei, Plectranthus scutellarioides
- Solenostemon shirensis (Gürke) Codd, now Coleus shirensi

== Gallery ==
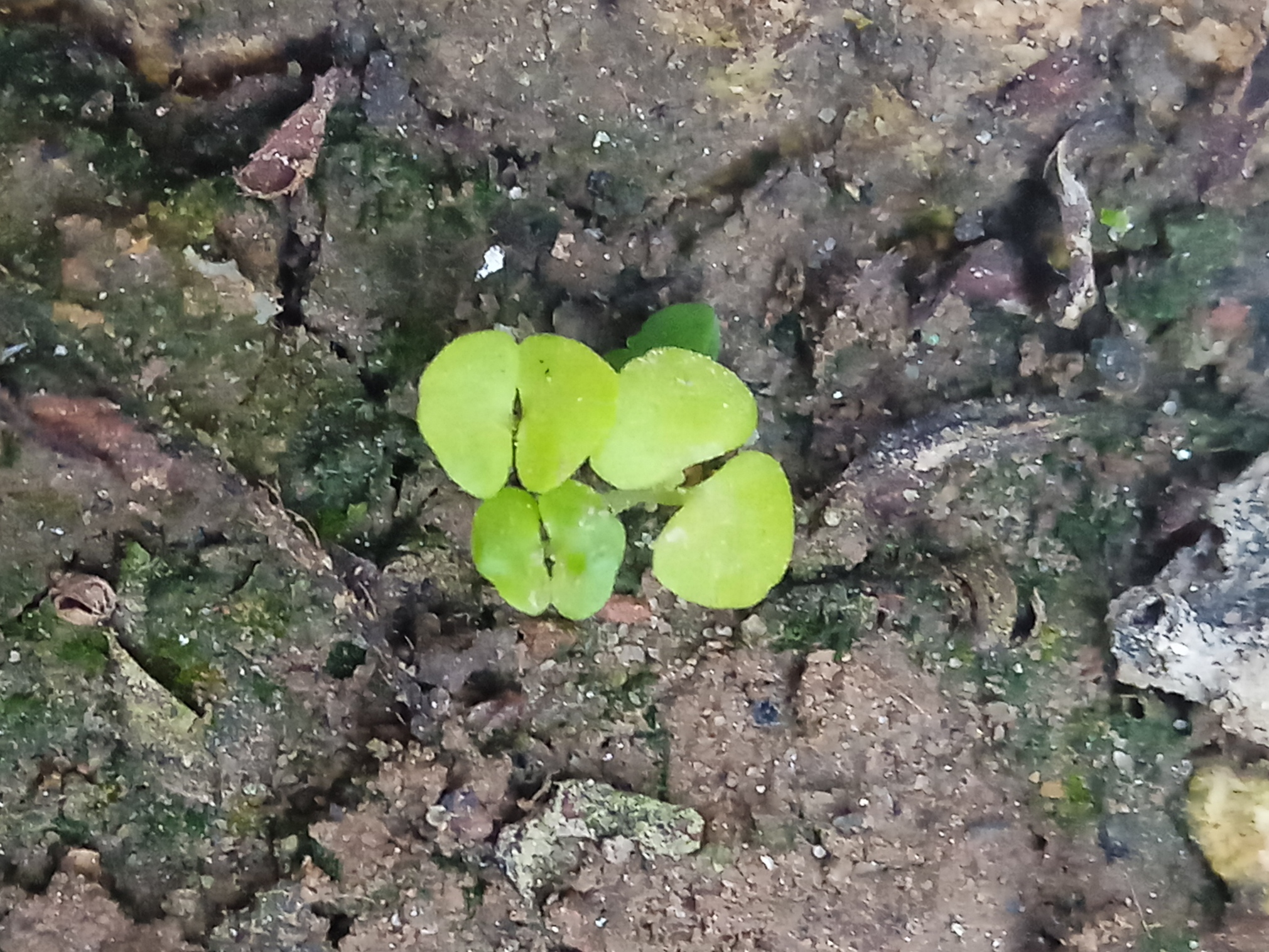
Young Solenostemon coleus seedlings growing in a pot.

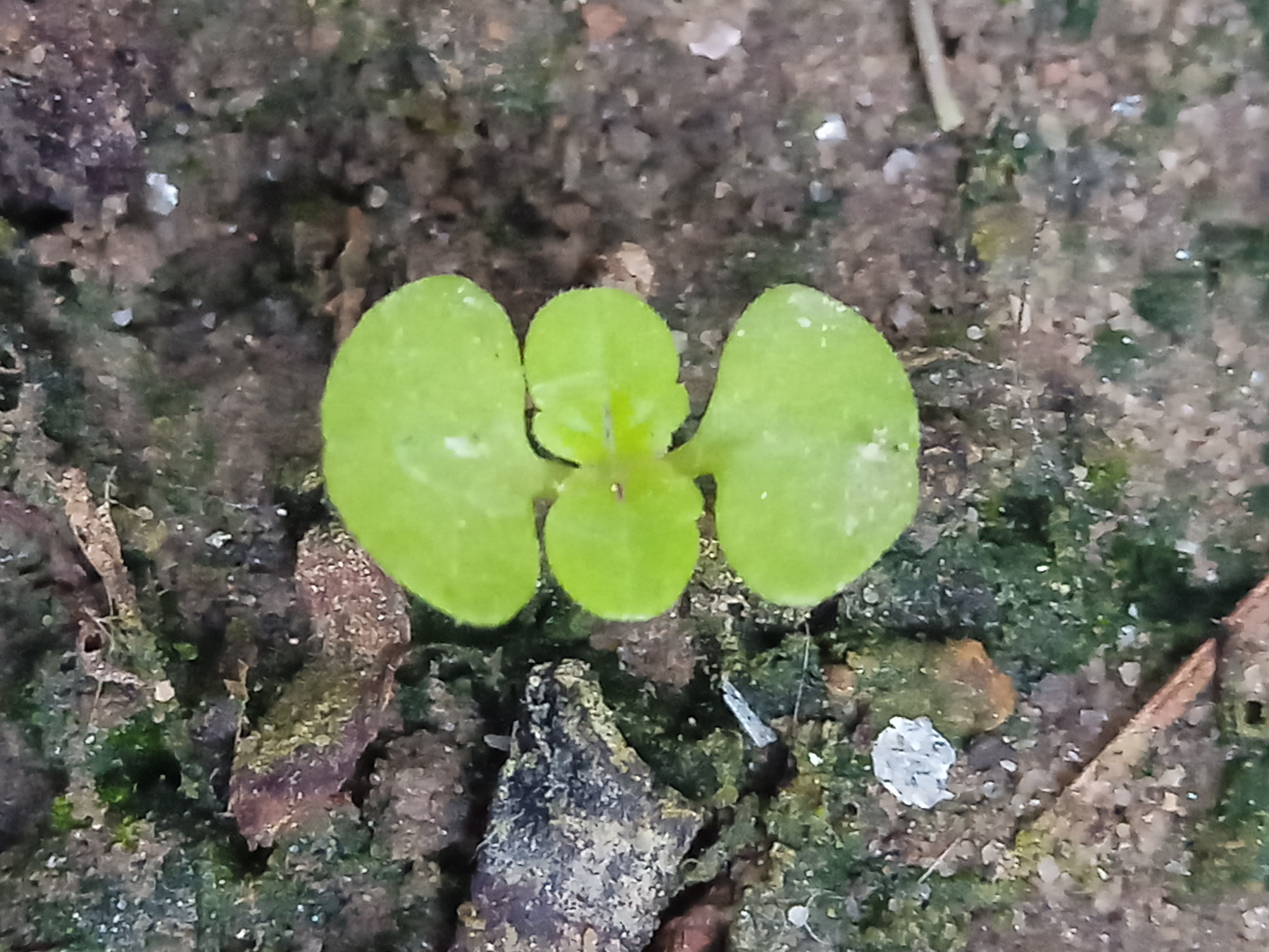
Early-stage Coleus plant with developing leaves.

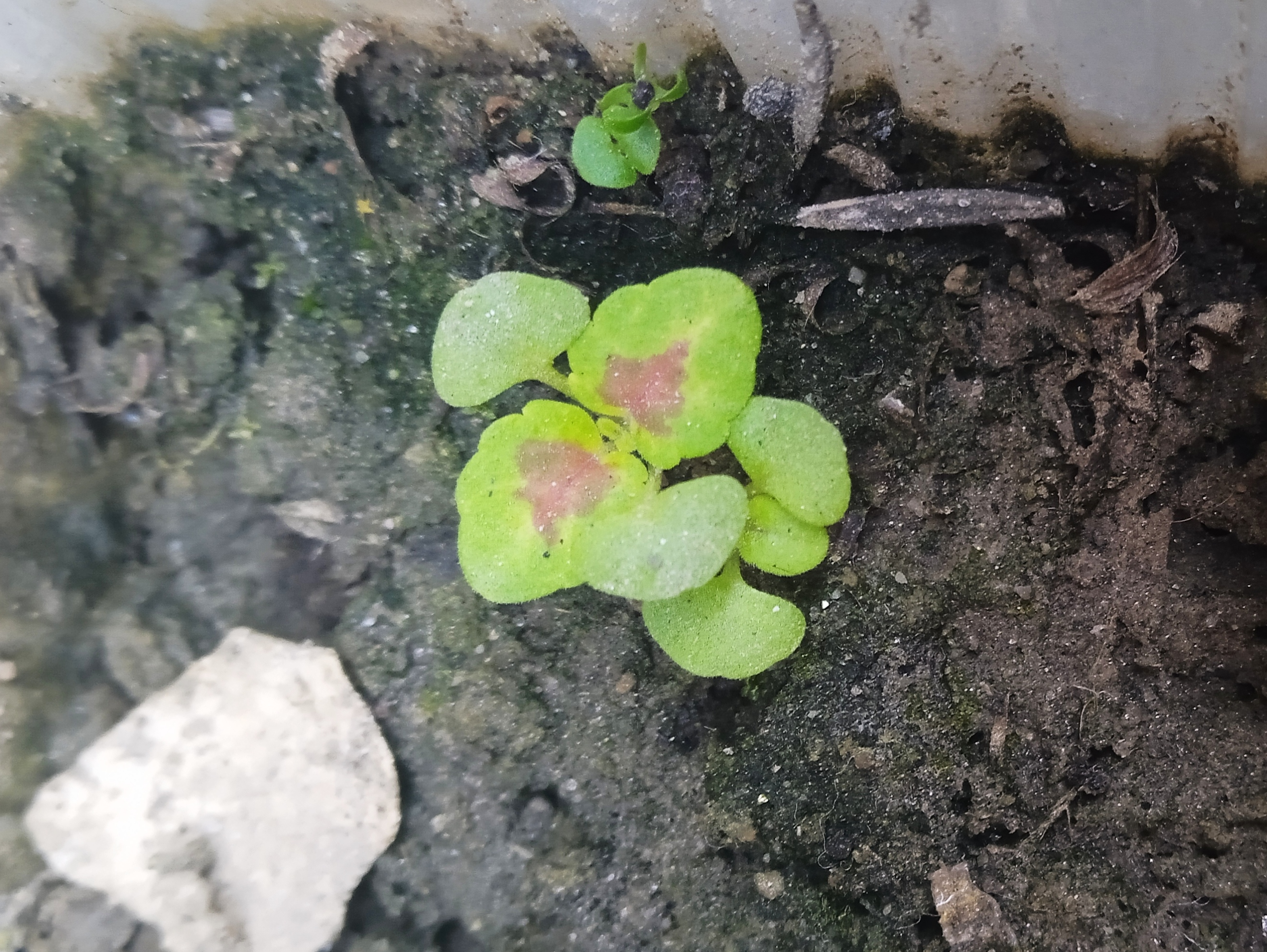
Young Coleus sprouting vibrant red new leaves.
