= Coleus ater =

Scientific classification
- Kingdom: Plantae
- Clade: Tracheophytes
- Clade: Angiosperms
- Clade: Eudicots
- Clade: Asterids
- Order: Lamiales
- Family: Lamiaceae
- Genus: Coleus
- Species: C. ater

Binomial name
- Coleus ater A.J.Paton

Synonyms
- Anisochilus wightii Hook.f.

Species of flowering plant

Coleus ater, synonym Anisochilus wightii is a flowering plant, occurring in South India.
