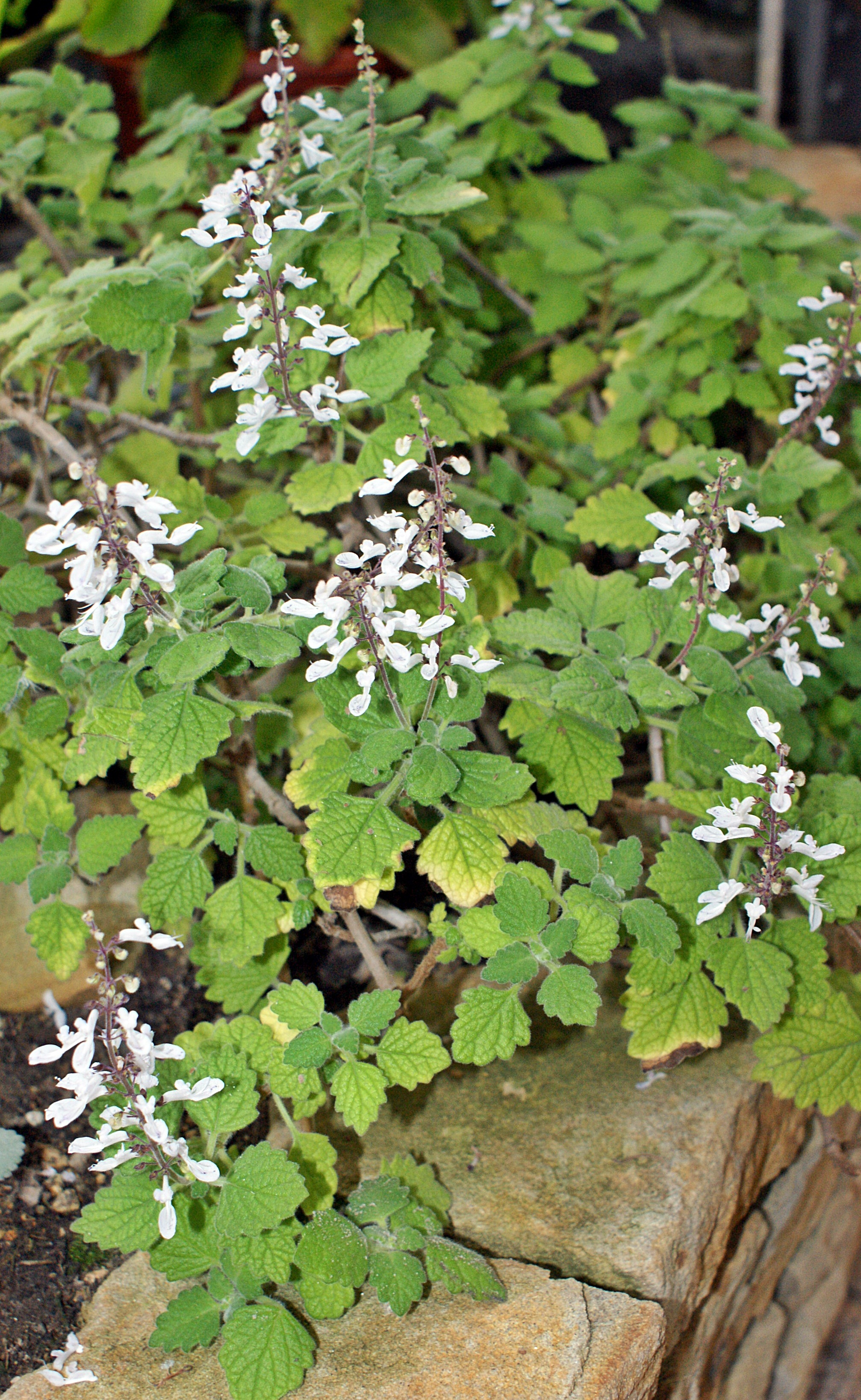

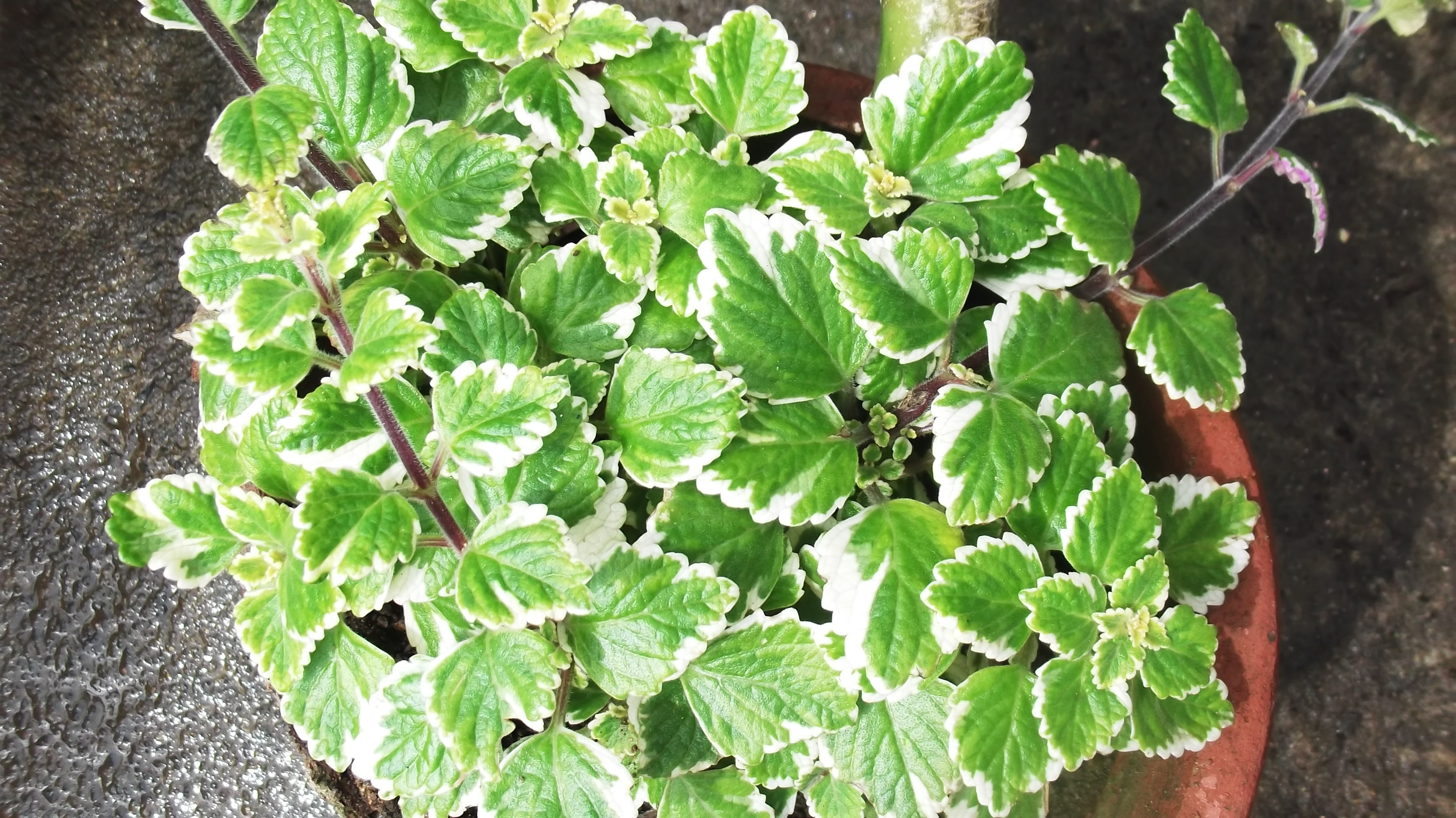
- Variegated form (below)

Scientific classification
- Kingdom: Plantae
- Clade: Embryophytes
- Clade: Tracheophytes
- Clade: Angiosperms
- Clade: Eudicots
- Clade: Asterids
- Order: Lamiales
- Family: Lamiaceae
- Genus: Coleus
- Species: C. madagascariensis

Binomial name
- Coleus madagascariensis (Pers.) A.Chev.

Synonyms
- List: Ocimum auricula Forssk. ex Benth.; Ocimum madagascariense Pers.; Plectranthus hirtus Benth.; Plectranthus madagascariensis (Pers.) Benth.; Plectranthus mauritianus Bojer, not validly publ.; Plectranthus pubescens Willd. ex Benth., not validly publ.; Plectranthus villosus Sieber ex Benth.

= Coleus madagascariensis =

Species of flowering plant

Coleus madagascariensis, synonym Plectranthus madagascariensis, is a species of flowering plant in the family Lamiaceae that is native to southern Africa and southeastern Africa. Its common names include, thicket coleus, Madagascar coleus, and candle plant.

== Description ==
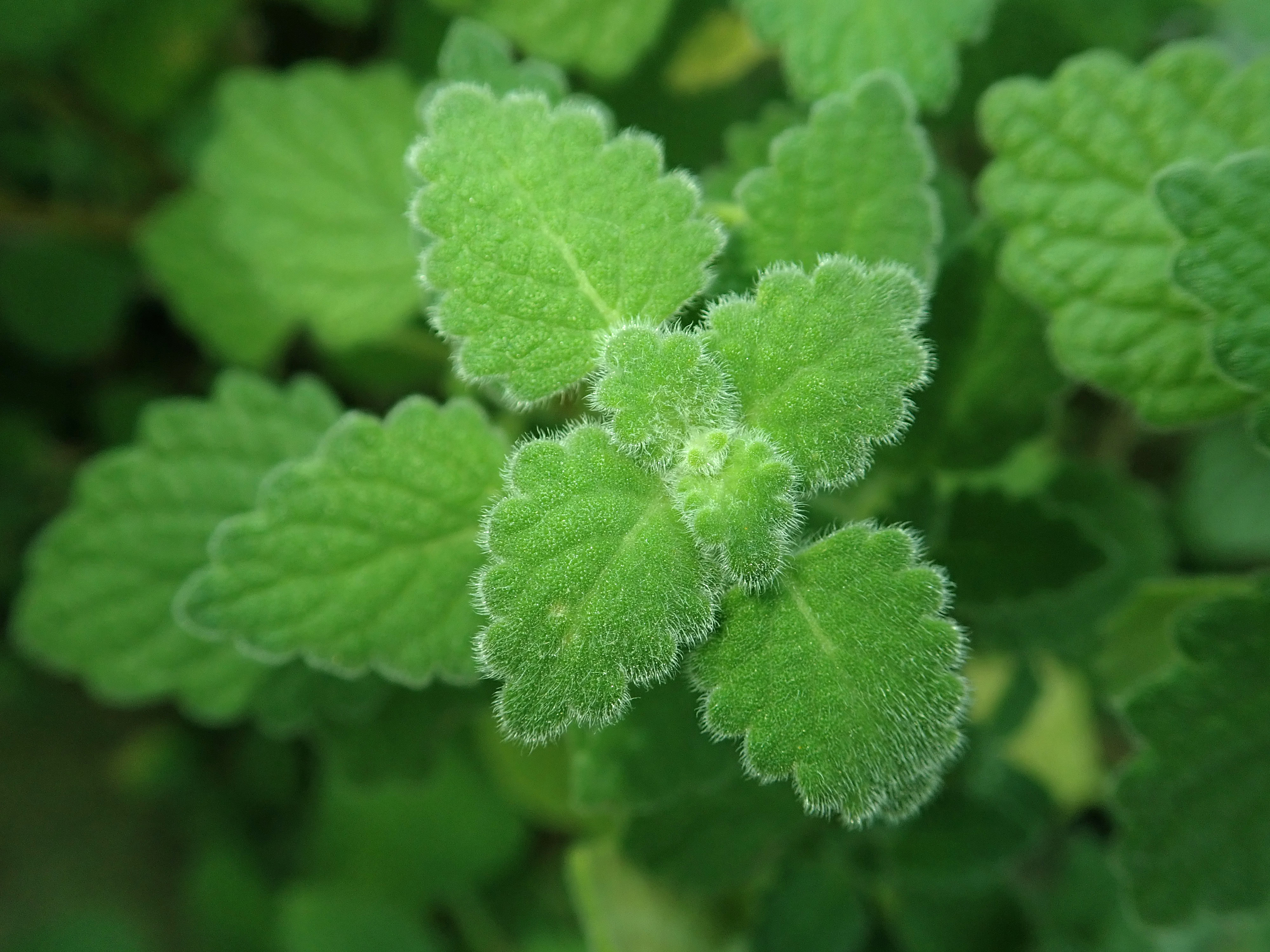
Leaf detail

It is a herbaceous, fragrant, semi-succulent, multibranched plant with a sprawling growth habit that becomes a dense rambling subshrub reaching 1m high, where it will root as the branches touch the ground. The young branches are square in cross-section with opposite leaves.

The dark green leaves are broadly ovate with 3-7 pairs of rounded teeth, somewhat hairy both above and below and 35-40 mm in length. The cultivar 'Lynne' features variegated leaves that have splashes of creamy-white to pure white margins on them. Crushed leaves create an oregano-like aroma.

=== Inflorescence ===
The small, white to mauve inflorescence is a terminal upright raceme, reaching 125 mm in length, supporting 4-6 flowers at each node. Each flower is 7-18 mm long, arranged in whorls, two-lipped and tubular in a spike-like inflorescence. The calyx is 3 mm long, extending to 5 mm after the flower falls and grasps the brown seeds or nutlets which are 1mm in diameter. Blooming occurs in early autumn to late autumn.

== Distribution ==
It is native to South Africa, Swaziland, Eswatini, Mozambique, Mauritius and Réunion, but not Madagascar. Growing in the seasonally dry tropical biome, it is found in shaded subtropical brushes, on dry rocky outcrops and forest edges. It can survive extreme drought by wilting and remaining in a state of weak, semi-dormancy until rainfall occurs again.

== Cultivation ==
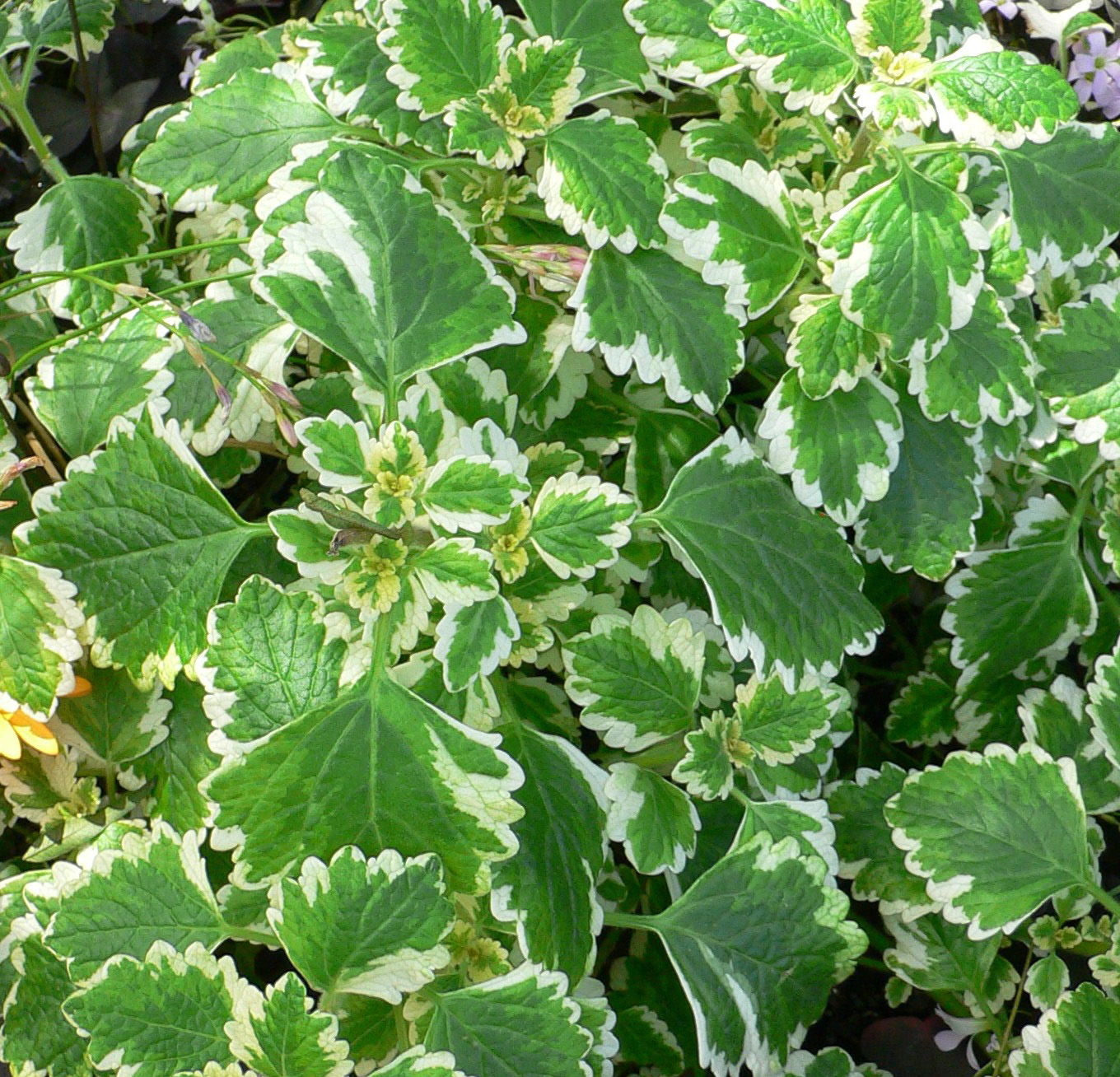
'Variegated Mintleaf'

Propagation can easily be made by cuttings in the summer, where no rooting hormone is required. The plant thrives in lightly shaded areas. Its cultivar 'Variegated Mintleaf' has gained the Royal Horticultural Society's Award of Garden Merit.

The plant is safe from pests because of the pungent leaf fragrance, therefore it is not predated by herbivorous animals. Though larval caterpillars of moths and butterflies can flourish on the plant's leafy parts, thereby disturbing the leaves.

=== Uses ===
It has been used in traditional medicine to treat coughs, colds and scabies. The pungent leaves and branches are sometimes hung in homes or rubbed on window sills to repel flies.

== Taxonomy ==
This species was first acquired in 1775 by Philibert Commerson in Mauritius or Réunion, though it should also have been known from Madagascar (due to its specific name, madagascariensis meaning ‘of Madagascar’). It was initially placed in the genus Ocimum and transferred to Plectranthus in 1832. Molecular studies on Plectranthus and closely related genera resulted in the alteration of the genus in 2019 and the restoration of the genus Coleus.
