= Coleus socotranus =

Conservation status
- Least Concern (IUCN 3.1)

Scientific classification
- Kingdom: Plantae
- Clade: Tracheophytes
- Clade: Angiosperms
- Clade: Eudicots
- Clade: Asterids
- Order: Lamiales
- Family: Lamiaceae
- Genus: Coleus
- Species: C. socotranus

Binomial name
- Coleus socotranus (Radcl.-Sm.) A.J.Paton

Synonyms
- Plectranthus socotranus Radcl.-Sm.

Species of flowering plant

Coleus socotranus, synonym Plectranthus socotranus, is a species of flowering plant in the family Lamiaceae.

It is endemic to Socotra, an East African island that is politically part of Yemen.

Its natural habitats are subtropical or tropical dry forests and rocky areas on the island.
