= Coleus unguentarius =

Conservation status
- Vulnerable (IUCN 3.1)

Scientific classification
- Kingdom: Plantae
- Clade: Tracheophytes
- Clade: Angiosperms
- Clade: Eudicots
- Clade: Asterids
- Order: Lamiales
- Family: Lamiaceae
- Genus: Coleus
- Species: C. unguentarius

Binomial name
- Coleus unguentarius (Codd) A.J.Paton

Synonyms
- Plectranthus unguentarius Codd

Species of flowering plant

Coleus unguentarius, synonym Plectranthus unguentarius, is a species of flowering plant in the family Lamiaceae. It is found only in Namibia. Its natural habitat is rocky areas. It is threatened by habitat loss.
