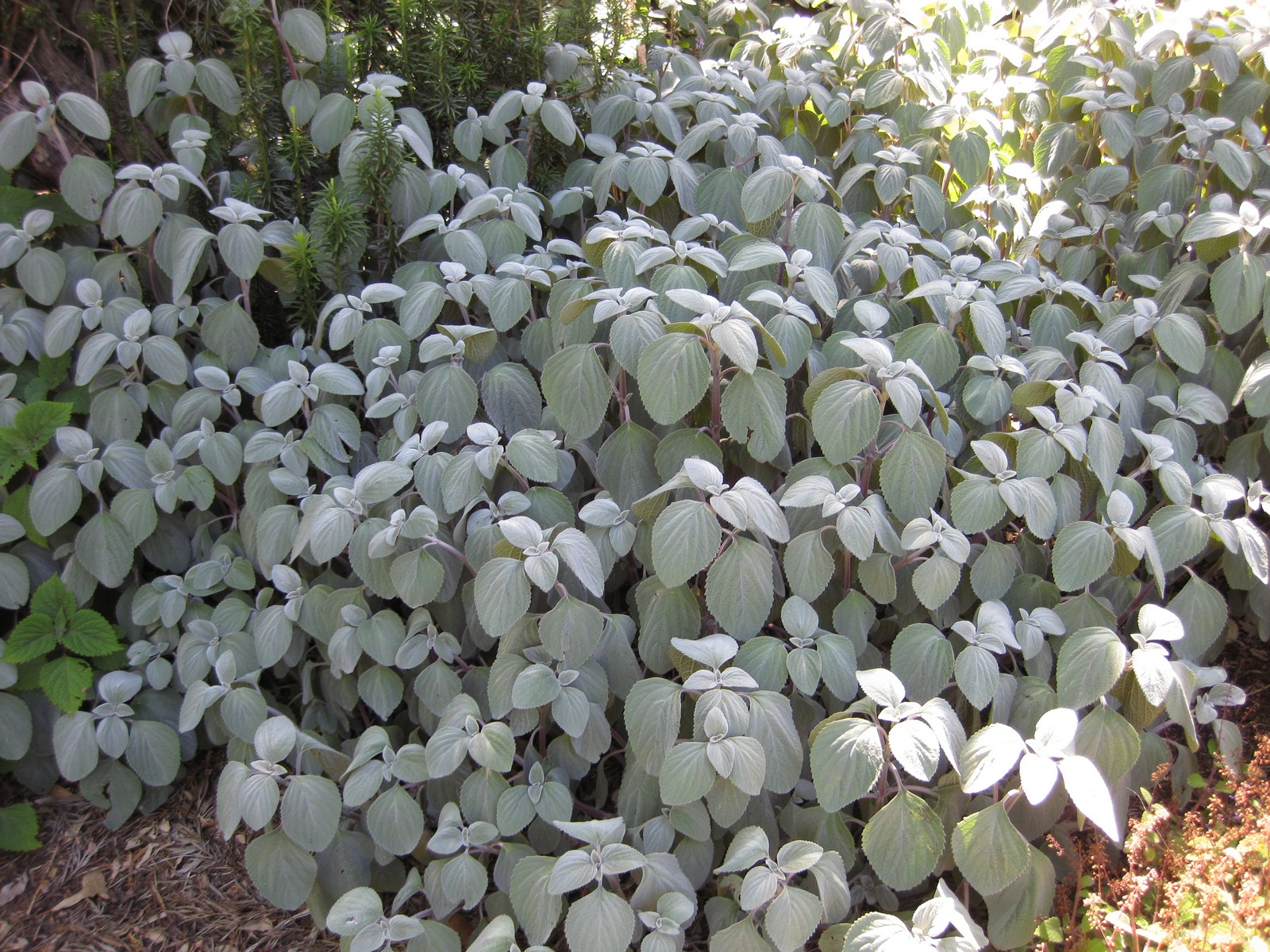

Scientific classification
- Kingdom: Plantae
- Clade: Tracheophytes
- Clade: Angiosperms
- Clade: Eudicots
- Clade: Asterids
- Order: Lamiales
- Family: Lamiaceae
- Genus: Coleus
- Species: C. argentatus

Binomial name
- Coleus argentatus (S.T.Blake) P.I.Forst. & T.C.Wilson

Synonyms
- Plectranthus argentatus S.T.Blake

= Coleus argentatus =

Species of flowering plant

Coleus argentatus, synonym Plectranthus argentatus, common name silver spurflower, is a species of flowering plant in the mint family. It is native to rock outcrops and rainforest in the border region of Queensland and New South Wales, Australia.

== Description ==
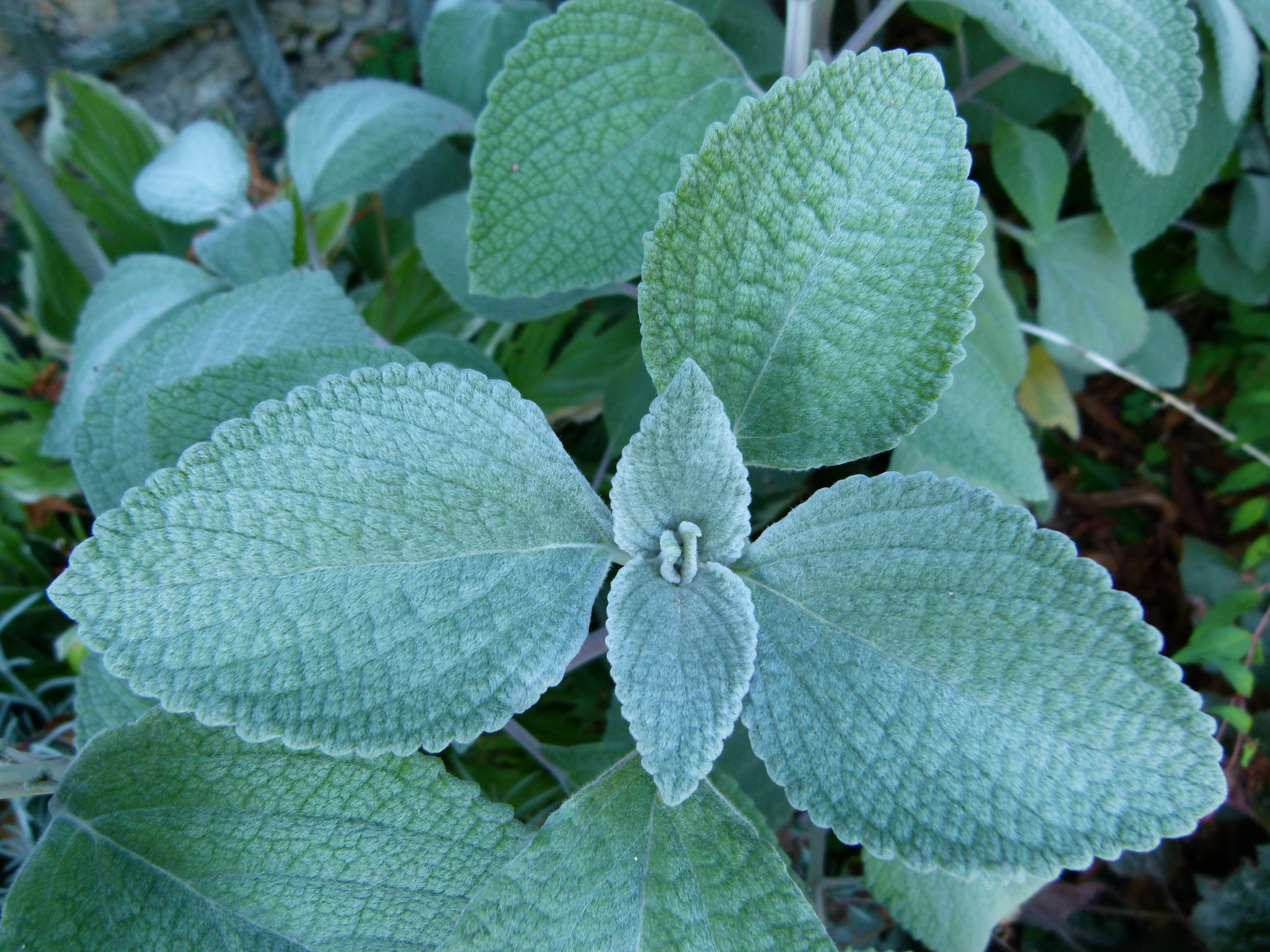
Foliage close-up

Growing to 1 m (3 ft) tall and broad, it is a spreading deciduous shrub. The hairy leaves are ovate to broad-ovate, 5–11.5 cm long, 3–5.5 cm wide with crenate margins. The hairs give the plant an overall sage green to silvery colour.

The flowers are borne on terminal racemes up to 30 cm (12 in) long, and are bluish white.

Originally described by Queensland botanist Stanley Thatcher Blake, its specific epithet argentatus is Latin for "silver", referring to its foliage.

== Cultivation ==
Coleus argentatus is cultivated in temperate regions as an ornamental bedding plant for its attractive silvery foliage. It strikes readily from cuttings, or can be grown from seed as a half-hardy annual. It has gained the Royal Horticultural Society's Award of Garden Merit.
