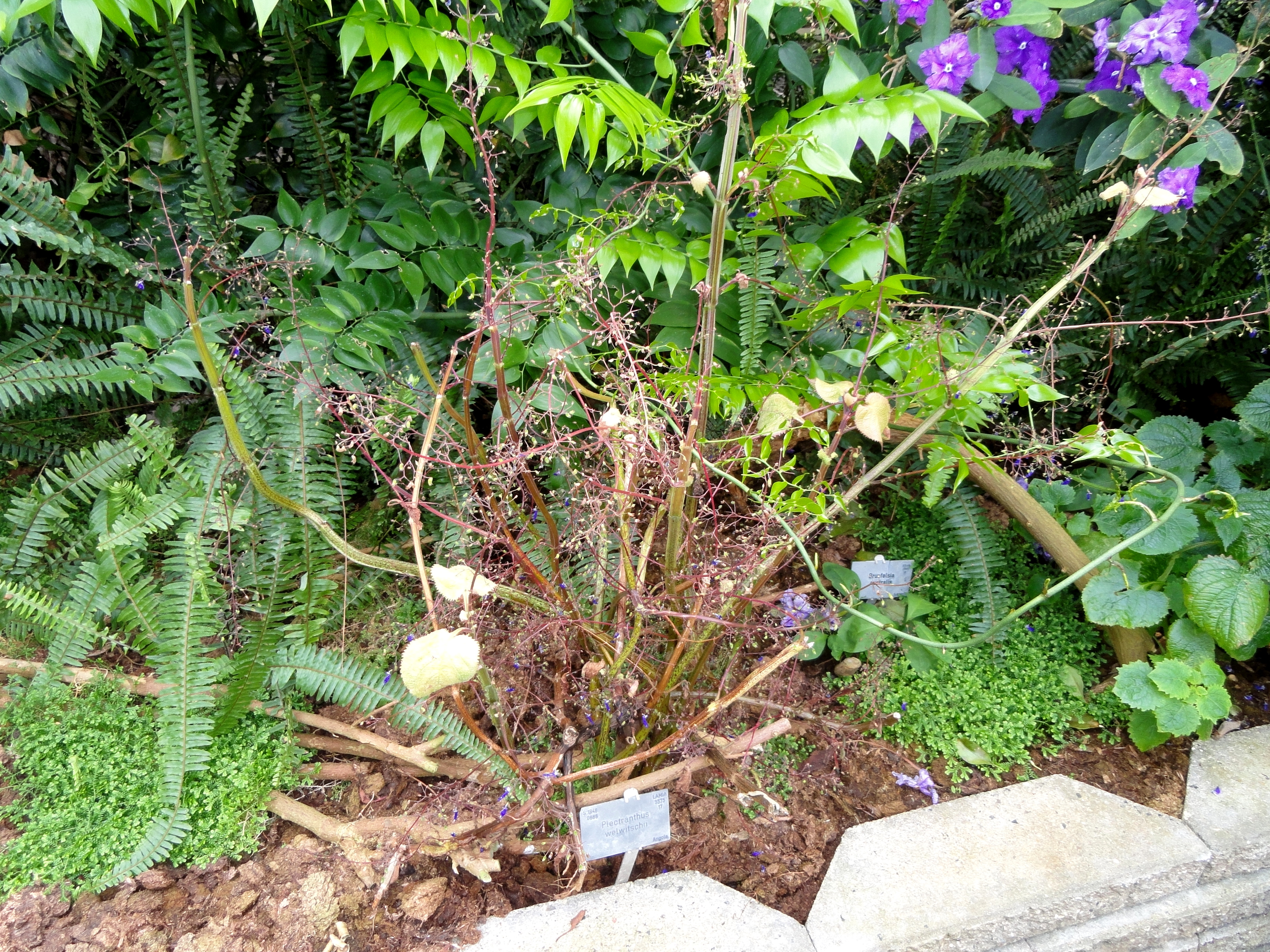

Scientific classification
- Kingdom: Plantae
- Clade: Tracheophytes
- Clade: Angiosperms
- Clade: Eudicots
- Clade: Asterids
- Order: Lamiales
- Family: Lamiaceae
- Genus: Coleus
- Species: C. fredericii

Binomial name
- Coleus fredericii G.Taylor

Synonyms
- Neomuellera welwitschii Briq., non Coleus welwitschii Briq.; Plectranthus welwitschii (Briq.) Codd

= Coleus fredericii =

Species of flowering plant

Coleus fredericii, synonym Plectranthus welwitschii, is a species of plant in the family Lamiaceae. The epithet is also spelt frederici.

The species was originally described by John Isaac Briquet in 1894, as Neomuellera welwitschii. It was transferred to the genus Plectranthus by Leslie Codd in 1972. A 2018 phylogenetic study showed that Plectranthus, as then circumscribed was not monophyletic, and so revived the then defunct genus Coleus. Since the name Coleus welwitschii had already been used for a different species, Taylor's name Coleus fredericii was used instead.
