= Coleus cataractarum =

Conservation status
- Vulnerable (IUCN 3.1)

Scientific classification
- Kingdom: Plantae
- Clade: Tracheophytes
- Clade: Angiosperms
- Clade: Eudicots
- Clade: Asterids
- Order: Lamiales
- Family: Lamiaceae
- Genus: Coleus
- Species: C. cataractarum

Binomial name
- Coleus cataractarum (B.J.Pollard) A.J.Paton

Synonyms
- Plectranthus cataractarum B.J.Pollard

Species of flowering plant

Coleus cataractarum, synonym Plectranthus cataractarum, is a species of flowering plant in the family Lamiaceae. It is found in Cameroon and Equatorial Guinea. Its natural habitats are subtropical or tropical moist lowland forests and rivers, near waterfalls. It is threatened by habitat loss.
