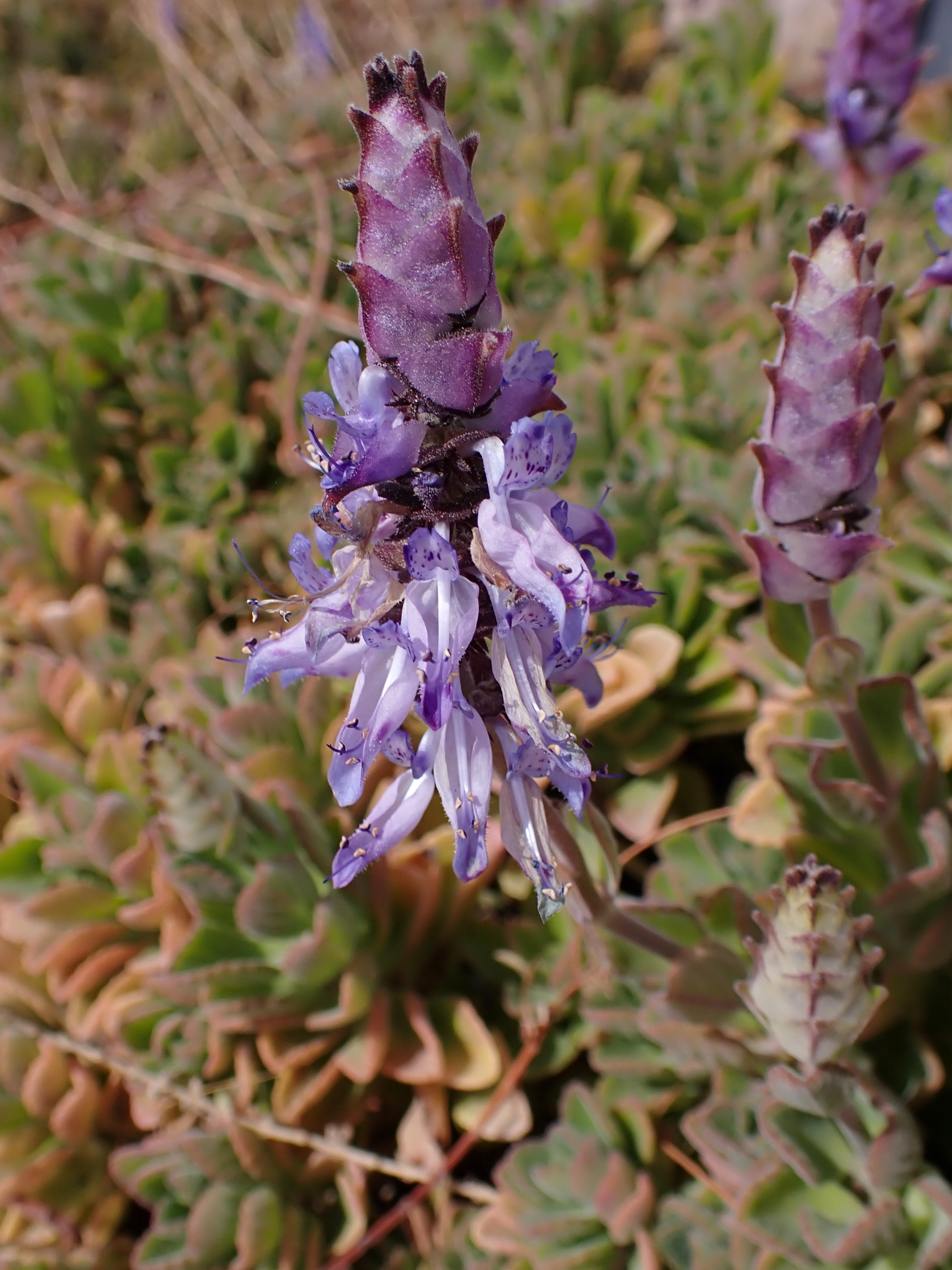

Scientific classification
- Kingdom: Plantae
- Clade: Embryophytes
- Clade: Tracheophytes
- Clade: Spermatophytes
- Clade: Angiosperms
- Clade: Eudicots
- Clade: Asterids
- Order: Lamiales
- Family: Lamiaceae
- Genus: Coleus
- Species: C. caninus

Binomial name
- Coleus caninus (Roth) Vatke

Synonyms
- Majana canina (Roth) Kuntze; Plectranthus caninus Roth

= Coleus caninus =

Species of flowering plant

Coleus caninus, synonym Plectranthus caninus, also called dogbane, piss-off plant and scaredy-cat plant, is a herb from the mint family Lamiaceae, native to southern and eastern Africa from Angola to Sudan and to India and Myanmar.

== Description ==
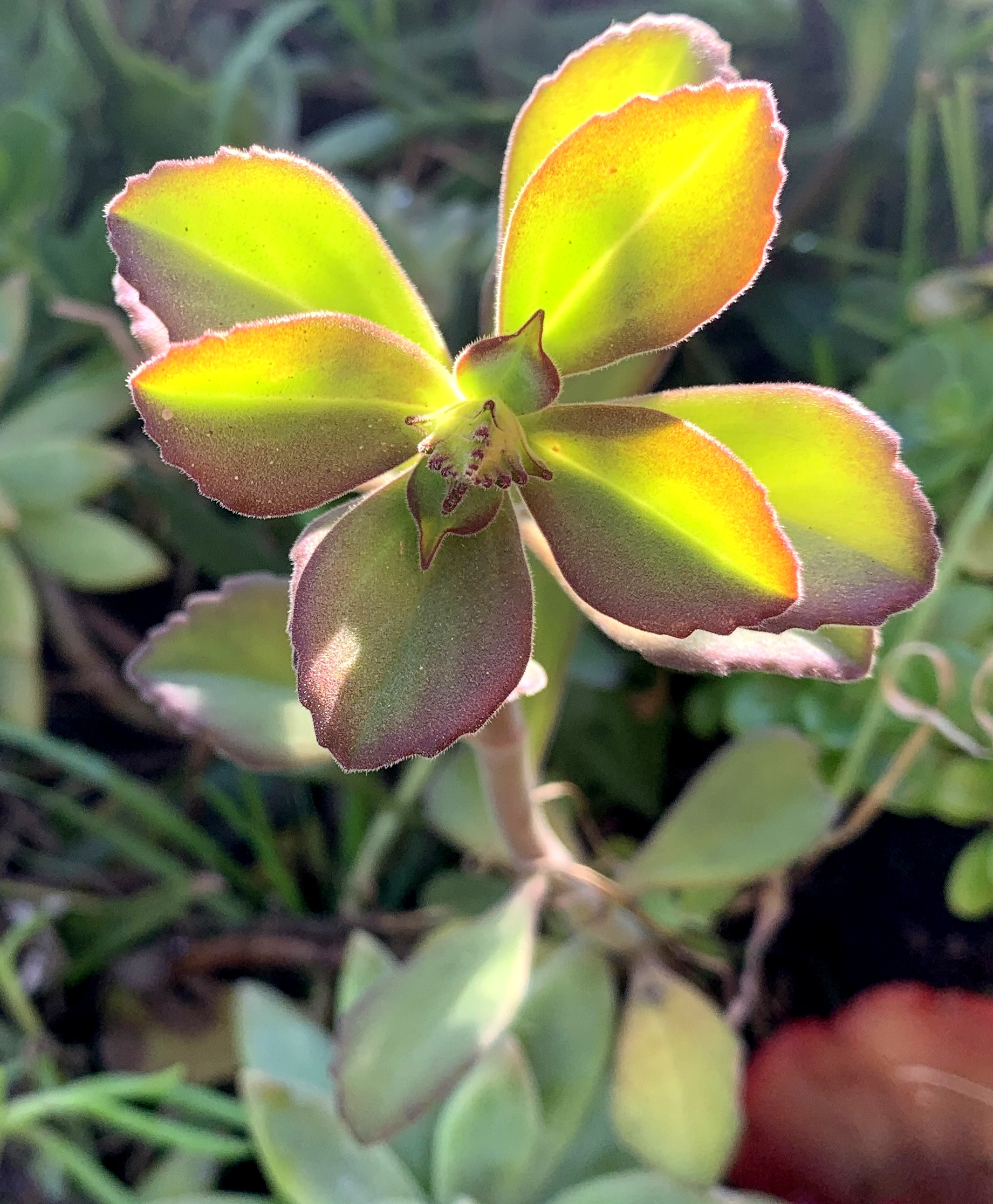
Cultivar with red tinged leaves

It is a perennial herb covered in small hairs that features narrow, obovate leaves that are approximately 3–4 cm long and 2–4 cm wide, with semi-erect branches. The pale blue-purple flowers have a succulent and tubular appearance, where the petals then open on the tall inflorescence spike.

Both the leaves and flowers of the plant are sticky to the touch and have an odor similar to Eucalyptus that some animals find unpleasant, deterring both insect infection and grazing by larger animals.

== Distribution ==
It is native to southern and eastern Africa and South Asia: Angola, Botswana, Burundi, DR Congo, Eritrea, Ethiopia, India, Kenya, Myanmar, Namibia, Northern Provinces, Rwanda, Somalia, Sudan-South Sudan, Tanzania, Uganda, Zambia, Zimbabwe.

== Cultivation ==
The plant can purportedly be used to keep away cats and dogs, who may smell the aroma on the intact leaves and be repelled, hence its various common names, though there is no scientific evidence to show that these claims are factual. An attempt to register "Coleus canina" to receive plant variety protection failed as it was considered to be only a clone of Coleus comosus (synonym Plectranthus ornatus).

These plants root easily from cuttings, tolerating mild drought conditions and full sun to part shade. Too much shade causes the stems to become leggy, as they stretch up to look for the sunlight, while the foliage lags behind. It does not tolerate frost and prefers moist soils, though when established it can tolerate drier conditions.

== Subspecies ==
Two subspecies have been described:

- Coleus caninus subsp. caninus – northern Tanzania to Eritrea, India to Myanmar
- Coleus caninus subsp. flavovirens (Gürke) A.J.Paton, synonyms Coleus flavovirens, Plectranthus caninus subsp. flavovirens – South Africa to Ethiopia
