= Coleus dissitiflorus =

Conservation status
- Critically Endangered (IUCN 2.3)

Scientific classification
- Kingdom: Plantae
- Clade: Tracheophytes
- Clade: Angiosperms
- Clade: Eudicots
- Clade: Asterids
- Order: Lamiales
- Family: Lamiaceae
- Genus: Coleus
- Species: C. dissitiflorus

Binomial name
- Coleus dissitiflorus Gürke

Synonyms
- Plectranthus dissitiflorus (Gürke) J.K.Morton

Species of flowering plant

Coleus dissitiflorus, synonym Plectranthus dissitiflorus, is a species of flowering plant in the family Lamiaceae. It is found only in Cameroon. Its natural habitat is subtropical or tropical dry forests. C. dissitiflorus is threatened by habitat loss.
