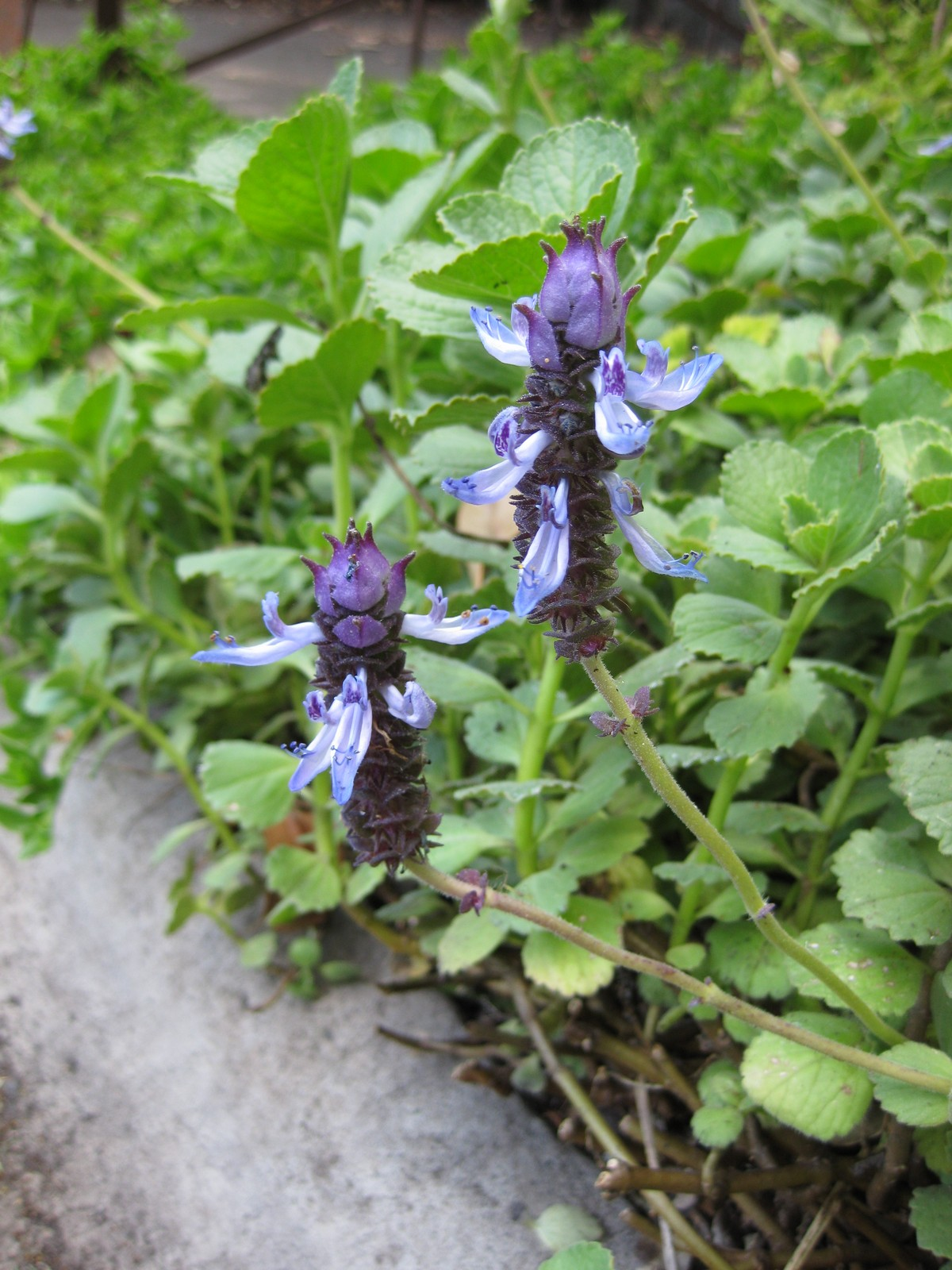

Scientific classification
- Kingdom: Plantae
- Clade: Tracheophytes
- Clade: Angiosperms
- Clade: Eudicots
- Clade: Asterids
- Order: Lamiales
- Family: Lamiaceae
- Genus: Coleus
- Species: C. neochilus

Binomial name
- Coleus neochilus (Schltr.) Codd

Synonyms
- Plectranthus neochilus Schltr.

= Coleus neochilus =

Mosquito bush

Species of flowering plant

Coleus neochilus, synonym Plectranthus neochilus, which is colloquially known as lobster bush, fly bush or mosquito bush, is a perennial ground cover with highly fragrant, partially scalloped, ovate leaves and purple blue inflorescent spikes.

== Description ==
The succulent, grey-green leaves present with small hairs on the tops, and a grey-green colour. The plant itself remains a ground cover for the duration of its life (45–60 cm), forming massive bushes rather quickly. The aroma of the plant has been said to resemble cannabis or skunk. They bloom twice a year, in late summer and in late winter.

The specific epithet neochilus is derived from the Latin word chilo, which refers to the calyx or lips.

== Habitat ==
The plant is found in dry brush lands, open and sometimes rocky woodland, from the Western Cape, Eastern Cape, KwaZulu-Natal, Mpumalanga to Limpopo in South Africa, as well as in Zimbabwe, Zambia and Namibia.

== Cultivation ==
Lobster bushes can tolerate wide temperature ranges, dry conditions and almost any soil, but prefer a well-drained sandy loam in full sun or partial shade. Hard pruning is suggested after flowering. Stems root very readily and the plant extends, where it forms a tidy cluster. Often planted in the landscape of difficult areas, the plant may become a little stressed in very dry conditions, but would revive when it receives some water.

They can easily be propagated from softwood cuttings and would multiply in the garden. They are rarely affected by pests.

== Uses ==
It is said that this plant can repel snakes, mosquitoes, flies and most garden pests as a result of its fragrant nature. This makes Coleus neochilus an ideal companion plant for vegetable gardens. Furthermore, reports point out that these plants can be used efficaciously as an air purifier.

The dried herb, known as "Falso Boldo" or "boldo-gambá", is employed for treating hepatic insufficiency and dyspepsia in folk medicine.

Tea made by steeping fresh leaves is similar to mint tea.

== Gallery ==
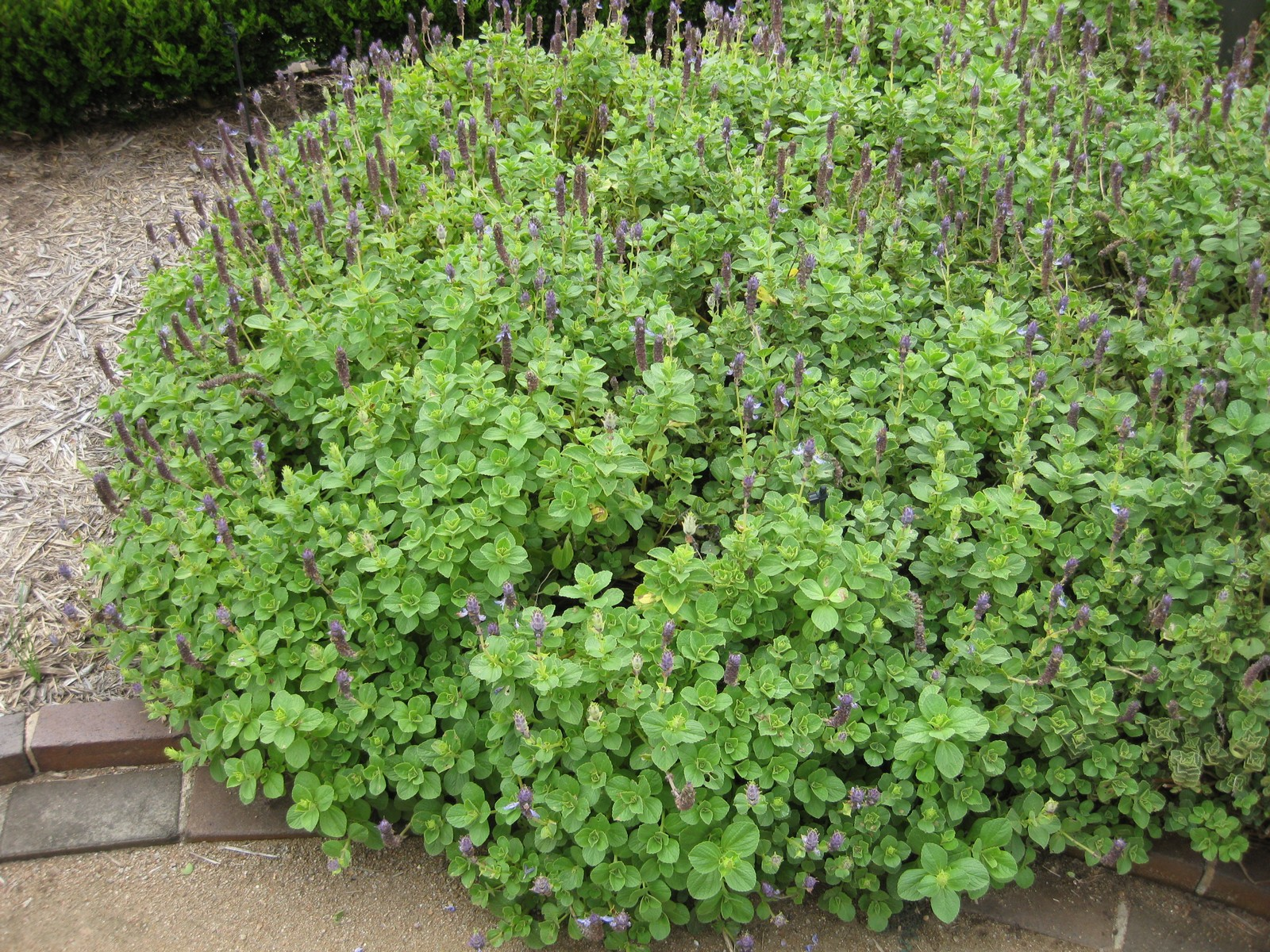
Shrub at the Botanic Gardens in Sydney

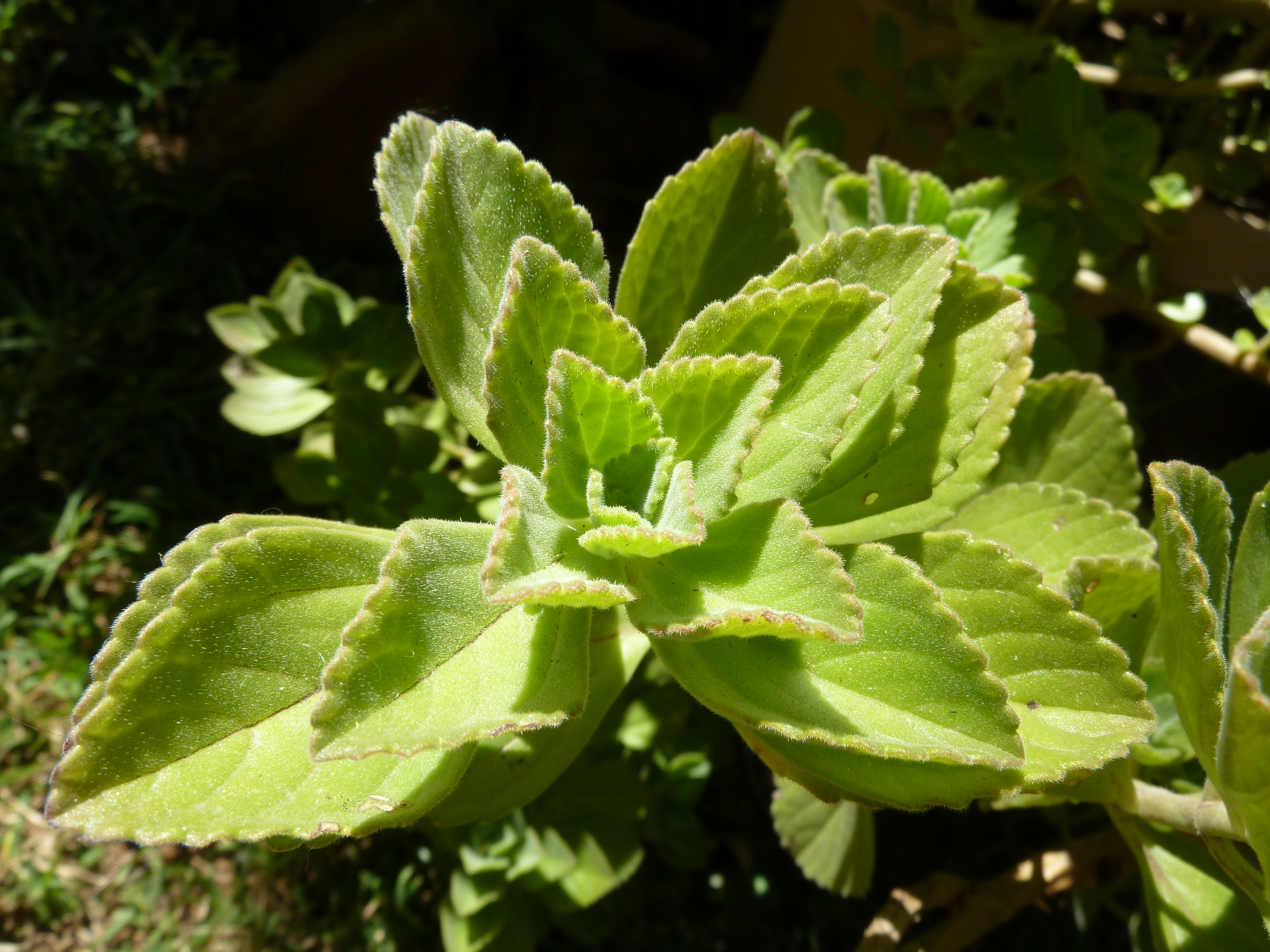
Close-up of foliage in Pretoria, South Africa

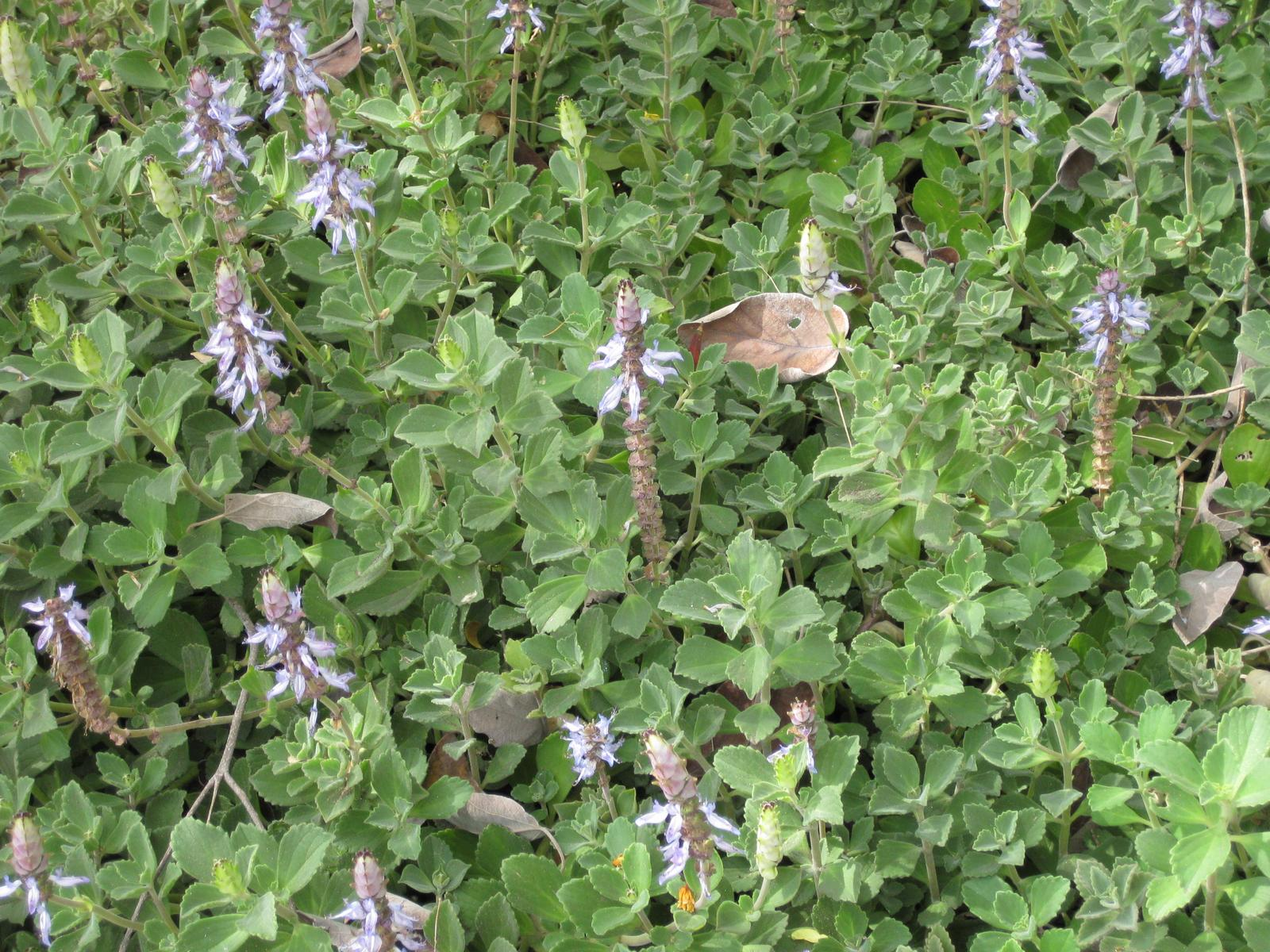
Flowering at Huntington Gardens, Los Angeles

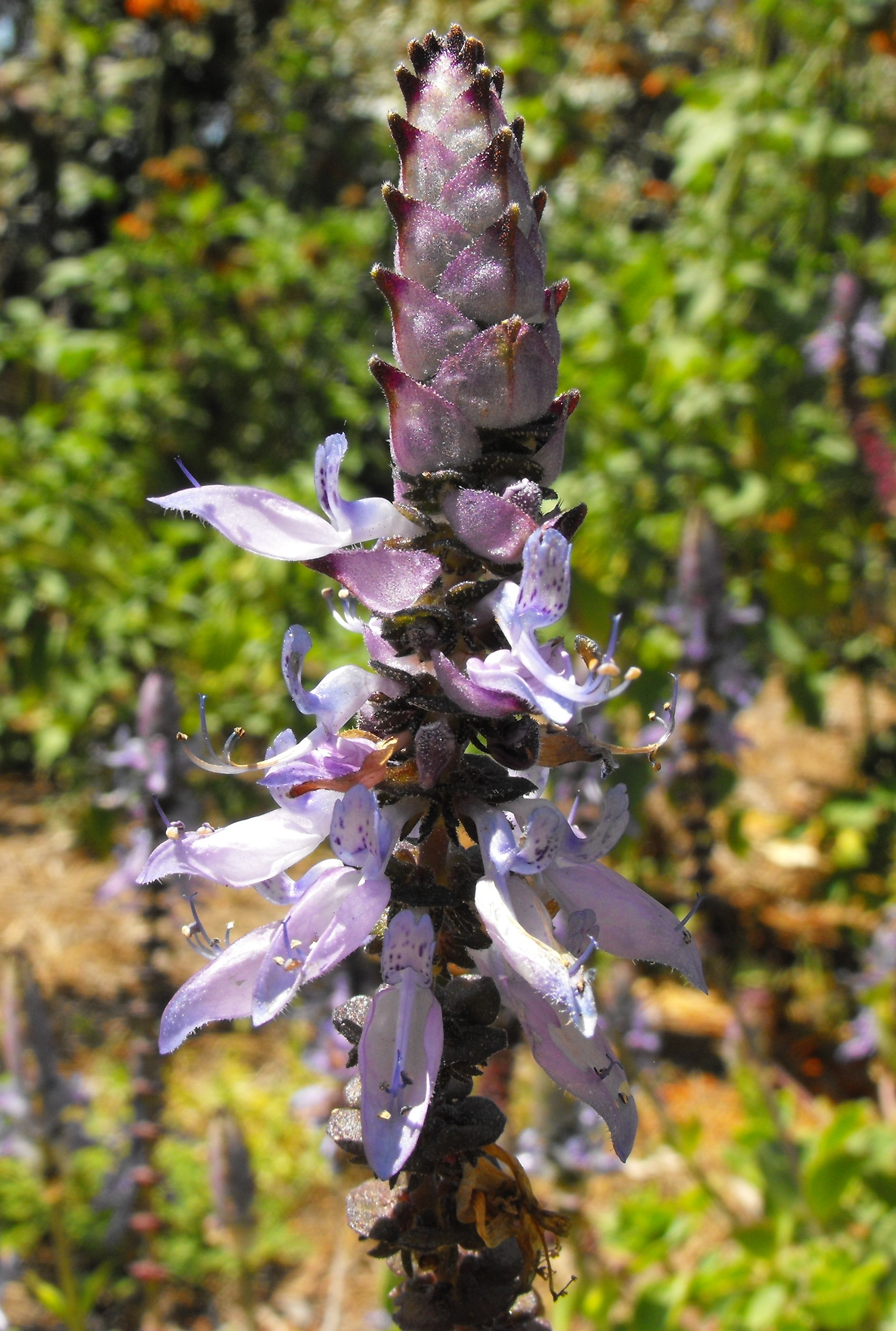
Close-up of an inflorescence

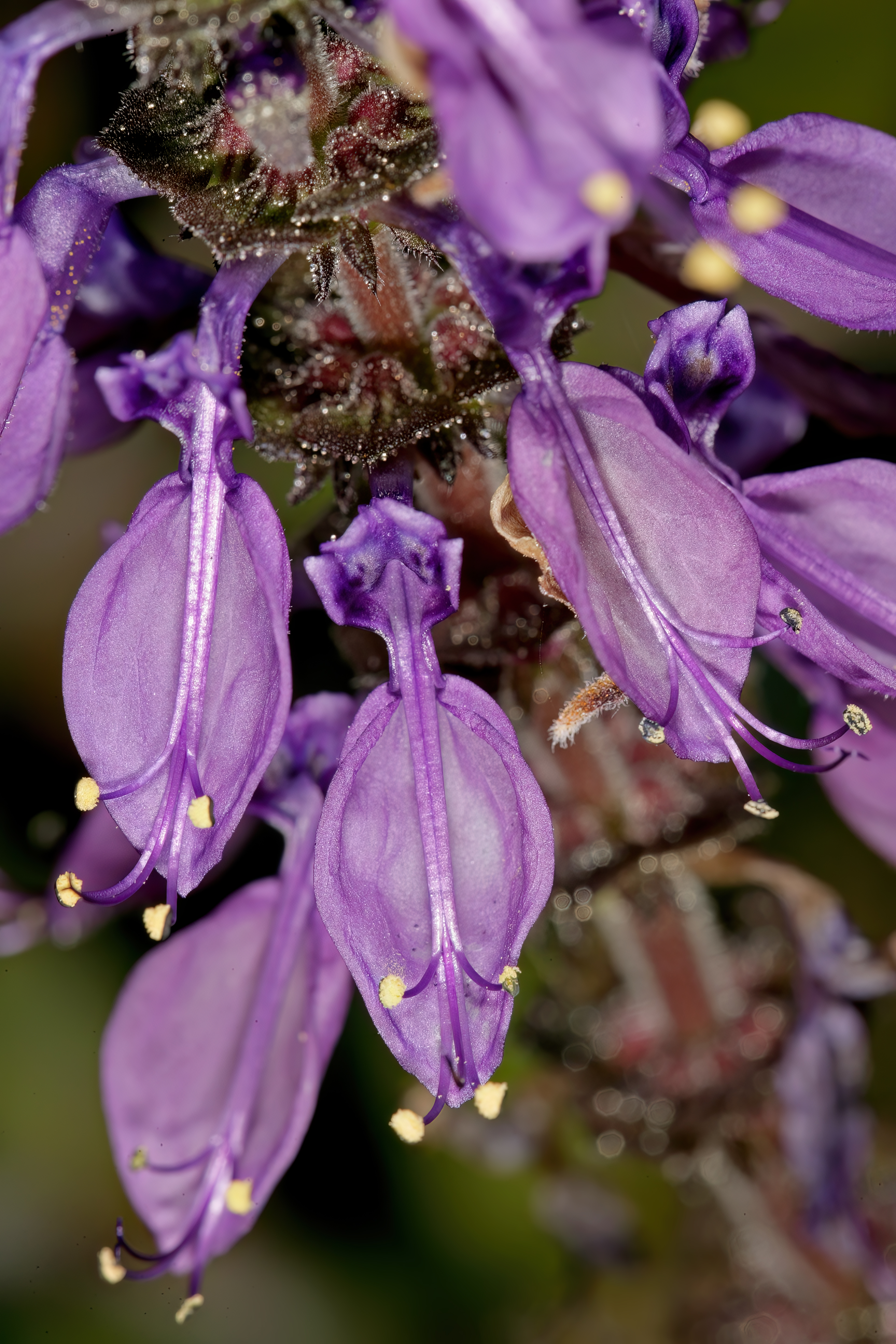
Flowers at Kirstenbosch Botanical Garden
