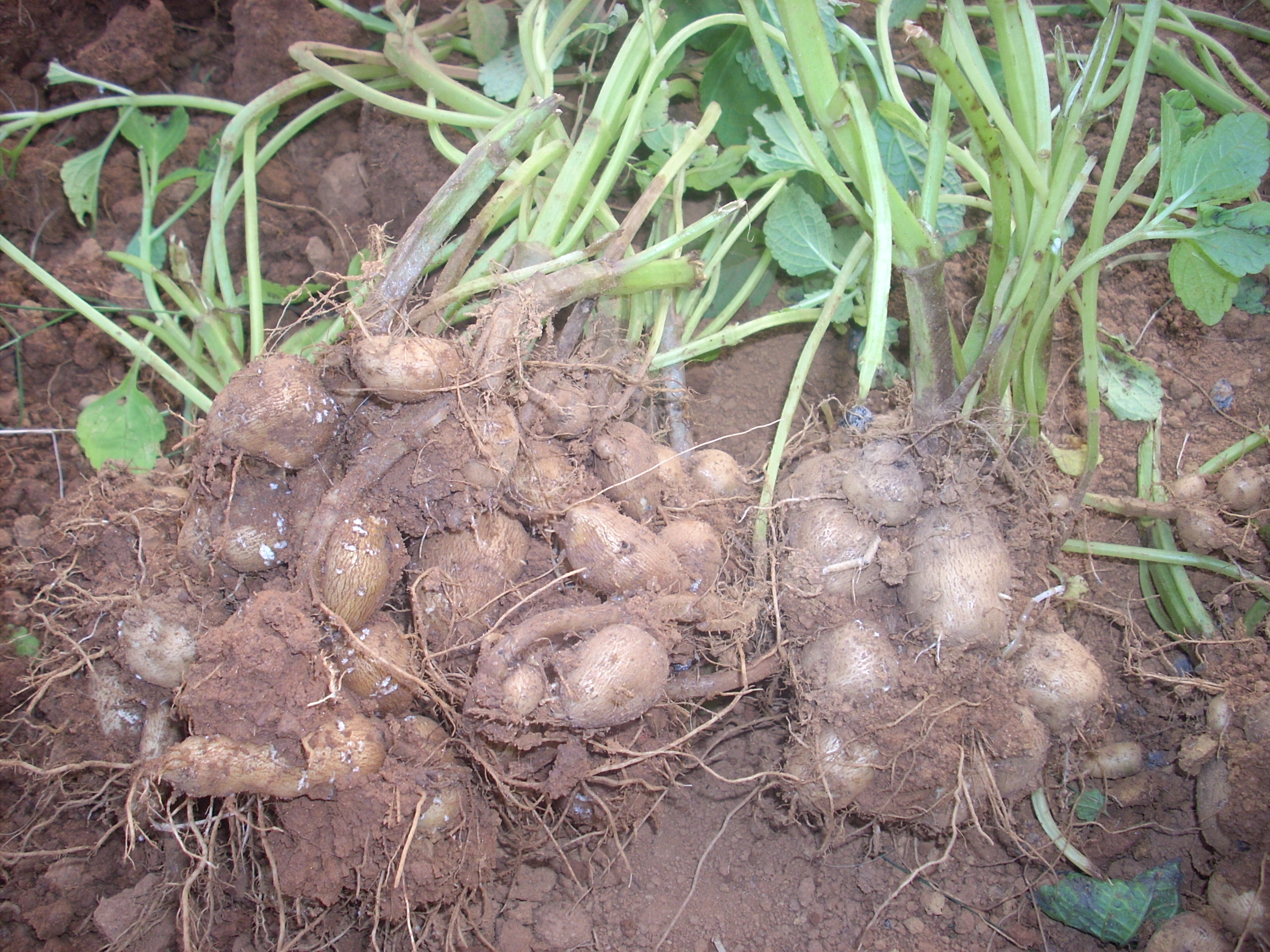

Scientific classification
- Kingdom: Plantae
- Clade: Tracheophytes
- Clade: Angiosperms
- Clade: Eudicots
- Clade: Asterids
- Order: Lamiales
- Family: Lamiaceae
- Genus: Coleus
- Species: C. rotundifolius

Binomial name
- Coleus rotundifolius (Poir.) A.Chev. & Perrot

Synonyms
- Calchas parviflorus (Benth.) P.V.Heath; Coleus dysentericus Baker; Coleus pallidiflorus A.Chev.; Coleus parviflorus Benth.; Coleus rehmannii Briq.; Coleus rotundifolius var. nigra A.Chev.; Coleus rugosus Benth.; Coleus salagensis Gürke; Coleus ternatus (Sims) A.Chev.; Coleus tuberosus (Blume) Benth.; Germanea rotundifolia Poir.; Majana tuberosa (Blume) Kuntze; Nepeta madagascariensis Lam.; Plectranthus coppinii Heckel; Plectranthus ternatus Sims; Plectranthus rotundifolius (Poir.) Spreng.; Plectranthus tuberosus Blume; Solenostemon rotundifolius (Poir.) J.K.Morton

= Coleus rotundifolius =

Species of flowering plant

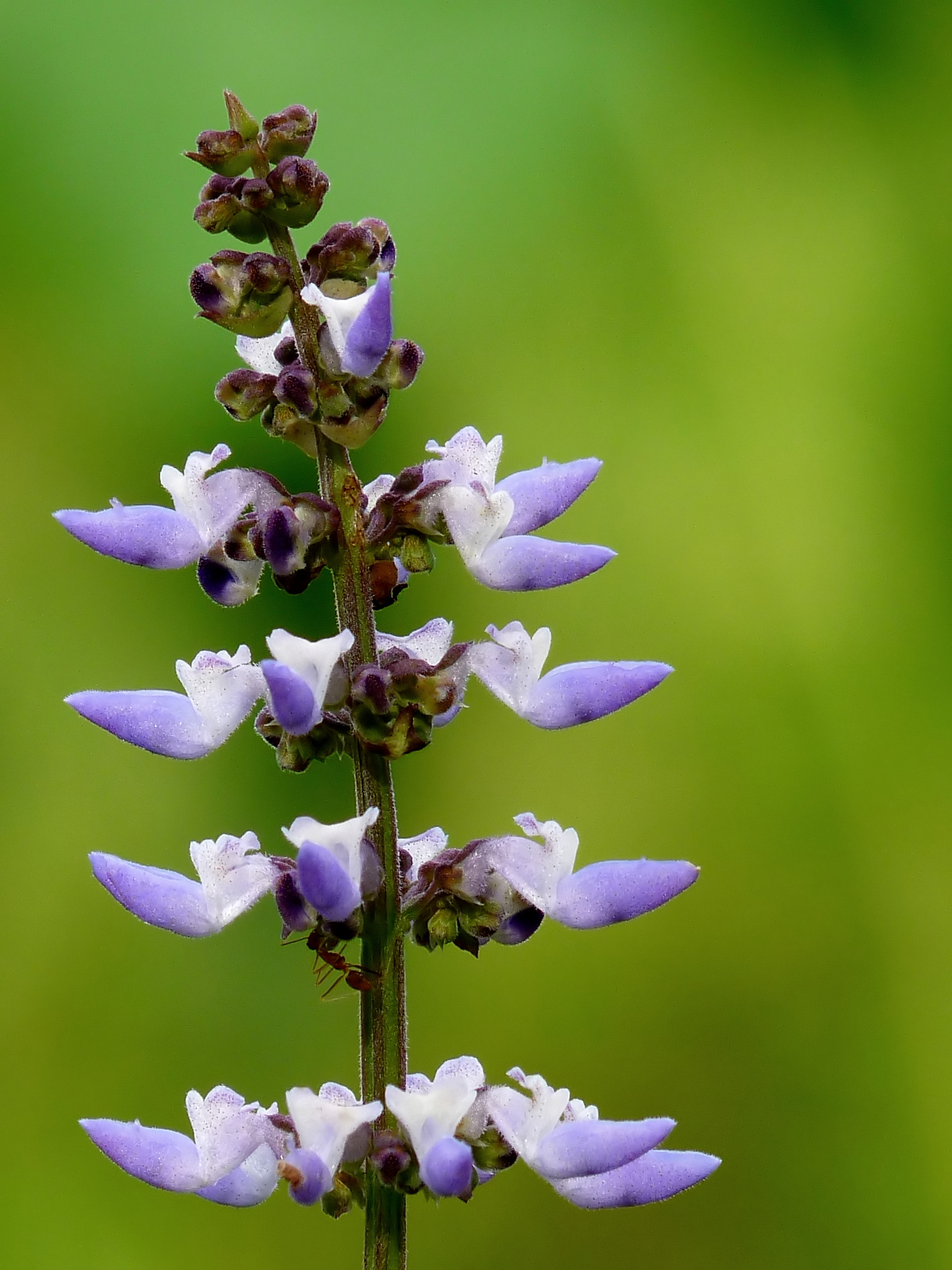
Flowers

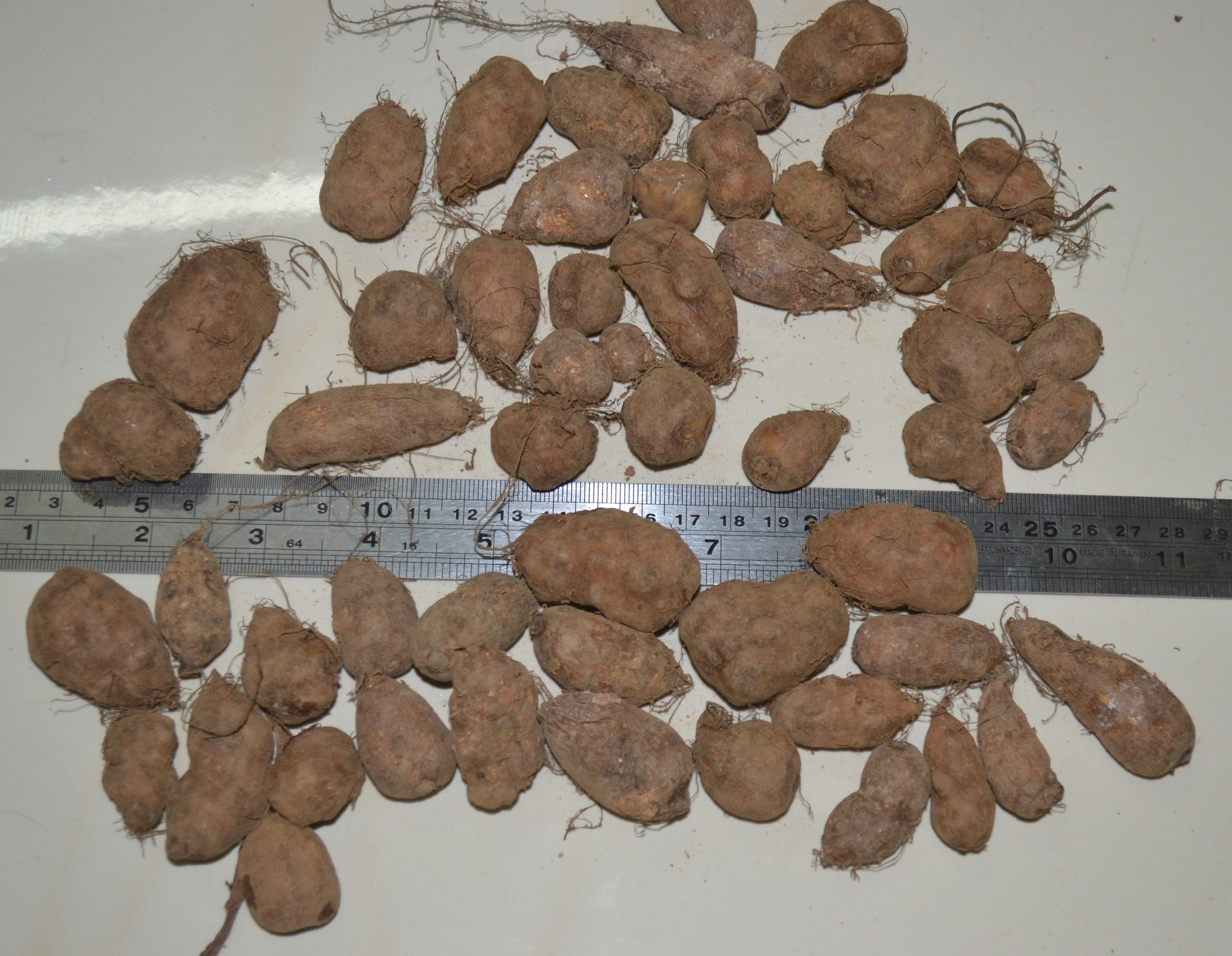
Tubers, with a ruler for scale

Coleus rotundifolius, synonyms Plectranthus rotundifolius and Solenostemon rotundifolius, commonly known as native potato or country potato in Africa and called Chinese potato in India, is a perennial herbaceous plant of the mint family (Lamiaceae) native to tropical Africa. It is cultivated for its edible tubers primarily in West Africa, as well as more recently in parts of Asia, especially India, Sri Lanka, Malaysia, and Indonesia.

C. rotundifolius is closely related to the coleus plants widely cultivated as ornamentals and is now again placed in the genus Coleus, after being placed in the defunct genus Solenostemon and in Plectranthus.

== Use and cultivation ==
The egg-shaped tubers of the native potato appear very similar to the unrelated true potato, though they are smaller than modern commercial varieties. They are typically boiled, but may also be roasted, baked, or fried. Their flavor is bland, but sweeter than Coleus esculentus.

Native potato is overwhelmingly a subsistence crop, though flour milling is reported in Burkina Faso.

C. rotundifolius is one of three Coleus species native to Africa grown for their edible tubers and using the same vernacular names. The others, C. esculentus and C. edulis, native to southern Africa and Ethiopia, respectively, have not spread beyond Africa. Its cultivation has been largely displaced by the spread of cassava, which was introduced by the Portuguese to Africa from South America about 500 years ago.

== Names ==
In Africa, Coleus rotundifolius is also known as the Hausa potato or Sudan potato, in addition to the names native potato and country potato.

Vernacular names of Coleus rotundifolius
Region	Language	Term
International and Europe
International and Europe	English	Chinese, country, Coleus, Frafra, Hausa, native, Sudan, or Zulu potato
International and Europe	French	pomme de terre de Madagascar, du Soudan ou d'Afrique coléus à tubercules
Africa
Africa	Chad	ngaboyo
Africa	Dioula, Minianka	fabirama, fabourama
Africa	Frafra (Gurenne)	pesa, pessa
Africa	Hausa	tumuku
Africa	Mandinka, Bambara	fa-birama. fabirama (fabourama) usu ni gé (oussou-ni-gué) usu ni fin (oussou-ni-fing)
Africa	Mossi (Mooré)	peinssa
South Asia
South Asia	Kannada	ಸಂಬ್ರಾಣಿ saṃbrāni (sambrani)
South Asia	Konkani	कूक kūka (kooka) And झाड़े कणगा ( Jhade Kanaga)
South Asia	Malayalam	കൂർക്ക kūrkka (koorka, koorkka)
South Asia	Sinhala	ඉන්නල innala
South Asia	Tamil	சிறு கிழங்கு ciṟu kiḻaṅku (siru kizhangu)
South East Asia
South East Asia	Thai	มันขี้หนู, man khee nuu
South East Asia	Malay	kembili, kemili ubi keling (Kelantan dialect), ubi kemili kentang jawa kentang hitam, kentang kleci (both in Indonesian standard)
South East Asia	Javanese	ꦏꦼꦤ꧀ꦛꦁꦲꦶꦉꦁ (kenthang ireng) ꦏꦼꦤ꧀ꦛꦁꦏ꧀ꦊꦕꦶ (kenthang kleci)

== See also ==
- Coleus esculentus (Livingstone potato)
