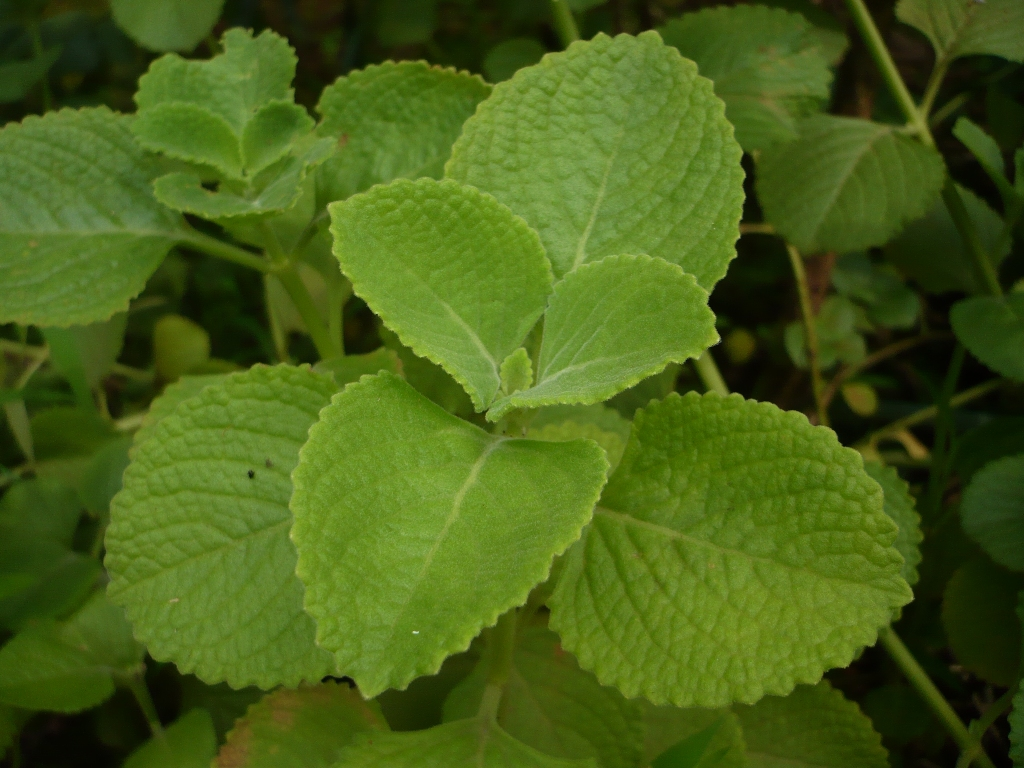
- Coleus amboinicus (syn. Plectranthus amboinicus)

Scientific classification
- Kingdom: Plantae
- Clade: Embryophytes
- Clade: Tracheophytes
- Clade: Angiosperms
- Clade: Eudicots
- Clade: Asterids
- Order: Lamiales
- Family: Lamiaceae
- Subfamily: Nepetoideae
- Tribe: Ocimeae
- Genus: Coleus; Lour. (1790)

Synonyms
- Anisochilus Wall. ex Benth. (1830); Ascocarydion G.Taylor (1931); Briquetastrum Robyns & Lebrun (1929); Burnatastrum Briq. (1897); Calchas P.V.Heath (1997); Capitanya Schweinf. ex Gürke (1895); Englerastrum Briq. (1838); Holostylon Robyns & Lebrun (1929); Isodictyophorus Briq. (1917); Leocus A.Chev. (1909); Majana Rumph. ex Kuntze (1803); Mitsa Chapel. ex Benth. (1832), pro syn.; Neohyptis J.K.Morton (1962); Neomuellera Briq. (1894); Pycnostachys Hook. (1826); Rabdosiella Codd (1984); Saccostoma Wall. ex Voigt (1845), nom. nud.; Solenostemon Thonn. (1827); Stiptanthus Briq. (1897); Symphostemon Hiern (1900)

= Coleus =

Genus of flowering plants

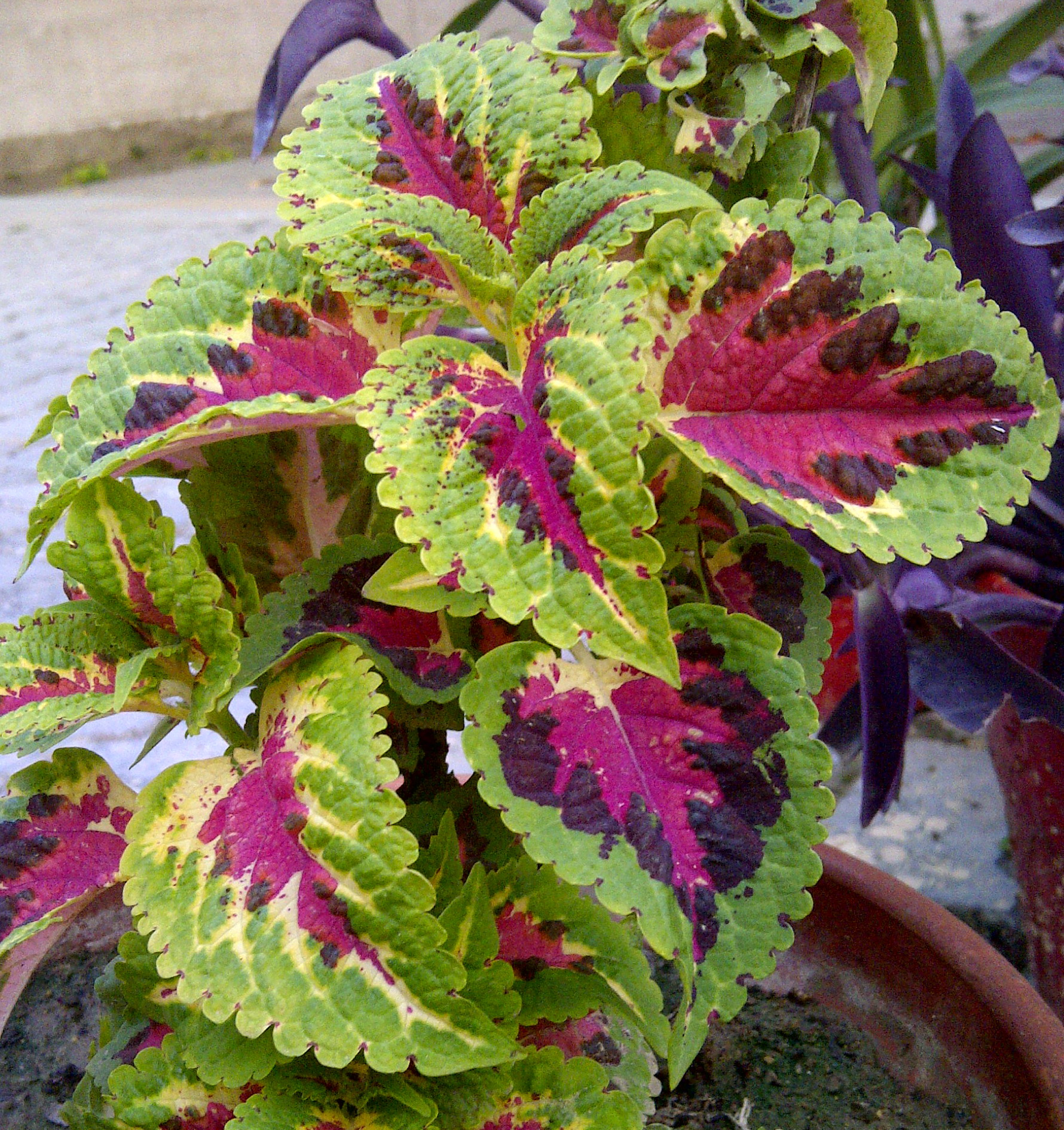
Cultivar of Coleus scutellarioides

Coleus (/ˈkoʊliəs/, KOH-lee-əs) is a genus of annual or perennial herbs or shrubs, sometimes succulent, sometimes with a fleshy or tuberous rootstock, found in the Afro-Eurasia tropics and subtropics.

The relationship among the genera Coleus, Solenostemon and Plectranthus has been confused. Coleus and Solenostemon were sunk into Plectranthus, but recent phylogenetic analysis found Plectranthus to be paraphyletic with respect to other related genera in the subtribe Plectranthinae. The most recent taxonomic treatment of the genus resurrected Coleus, and 212 names were changed from combinations in Plectranthus, Pycnostachys and Anisochilus. Equilabium was segregated from Plectranthus, after phylogenetic studies supported its recognition as a phylogenetically distinct genus. Common names for Coleus include spurflower, flybush, hedgehog flower and hullwort.

Coleus are cultivated as ornamental plants, particularly Coleus scutellarioides (syns. Coleus blumei, Plectranthus scutellarioides), which is popular as a garden plant for its brightly colored foliage.

Other species that produce root tubers are cultivated for food, including Coleus esculentus, Coleus rotundifolius and Coleus maculosus subsp. edulis.

== Taxonomy ==
The genus Coleus was first described by João de Loureiro in 1790. Using morphological characters as a guide, it was distinguished from Plectranthus (first described by Charles L'Héritier in 1788) by having its four stamens fused together rather than free to the base. In 1962, J.K. Morton noted that fused stamens were more widespread than previously thought, and accordingly merged Coleus into Plectranthus, while maintaining Solenostemon and some other genera as distinct. Most sources followed Morton in submerging Coleus; some kept Solenostemon distinct, although others submerged it into Plectranthus along with Coleus.

A preliminary study of the tribe Ocimeae in 2004 showed that the subtribe Plectranthinae was monophyletic, with two main clades: one containing the type species of Coleus and including Solenostemon, the other containing the type species of Plectranthus along with some other genera, so that Plectranthus when broadly defined was not monophyletic. A more detailed study in 2018 reached similar conclusions, and suggested that Coleus (including Solenostemon) should be recognized again, Plectranthus more narrowly defined, and a new genus, Equilabium erected for a clade of former Plectranthus species mainly from tropical Africa. The many new binomial combinations needed to implement this approach were provided in 2019.

=== Phylogeny ===
Paton et al. in 2019 published a summary cladogram for the subtribe Plectranthinae, based on a study in 2018. In the version below, the three genera accepted by Paton et al. that formed part of Plectranthus s.l. are highlighted.

- Tribe Ocimeae
  - Subtribe Ociminae
  - - Subtribe Plectranthinae
      - - Alvesia (3 spp.)
        - - Aeollanthus (42 spp.)
          - - - Tetradenia + Thorncroftia (29 spp.)
              - Plectranthus (72 spp.)
            - Capitanopsis (6 spp.)
            - Equilabium (42 spp.)
      - Coleus (294 spp.)

== Species ==
Paton et al. (2019) listed 294 species of Coleus, many transferred from Plectranthus. As of April 2024, Plants of the World Online lists 302. Species include:

- Coleus amboinicus, syn. Plectranthus amboinicus
- Coleus argentatus
- Coleus australis
- Coleus barbatus, syn. Plectranthus barbatus
- Coleus caninus, syn. Plectranthus caninus
- Coleus cataractarum
- Coleus comosus, syn. Plectranthus ornatus (sold as "Coleus canina" or "scaredy cat plant")
- Coleus cremnus
- Coleus dissitiflorus
- Coleus esculentus, syn. Plectranthus esculentus
- Coleus fredericii, syn. Plectranthus welwitschii
- Coleus ferricola
- Coleus graveolens
- Coleus habrophyllus
- Coleus madagascariensis
- Coleus maculosus
- Coleus neochilus
- Coleus rotundifolius, syn. Plectranthus rotundifolius
- Coleus scutellarioides, syns Coleus blumei, Plectranthus scutellarioides
- Coleus socotranus, syn. Plectranthus socotranus
- Coleus unguentarius, syn. Plectranthus unguentarius

== Image gallery ==
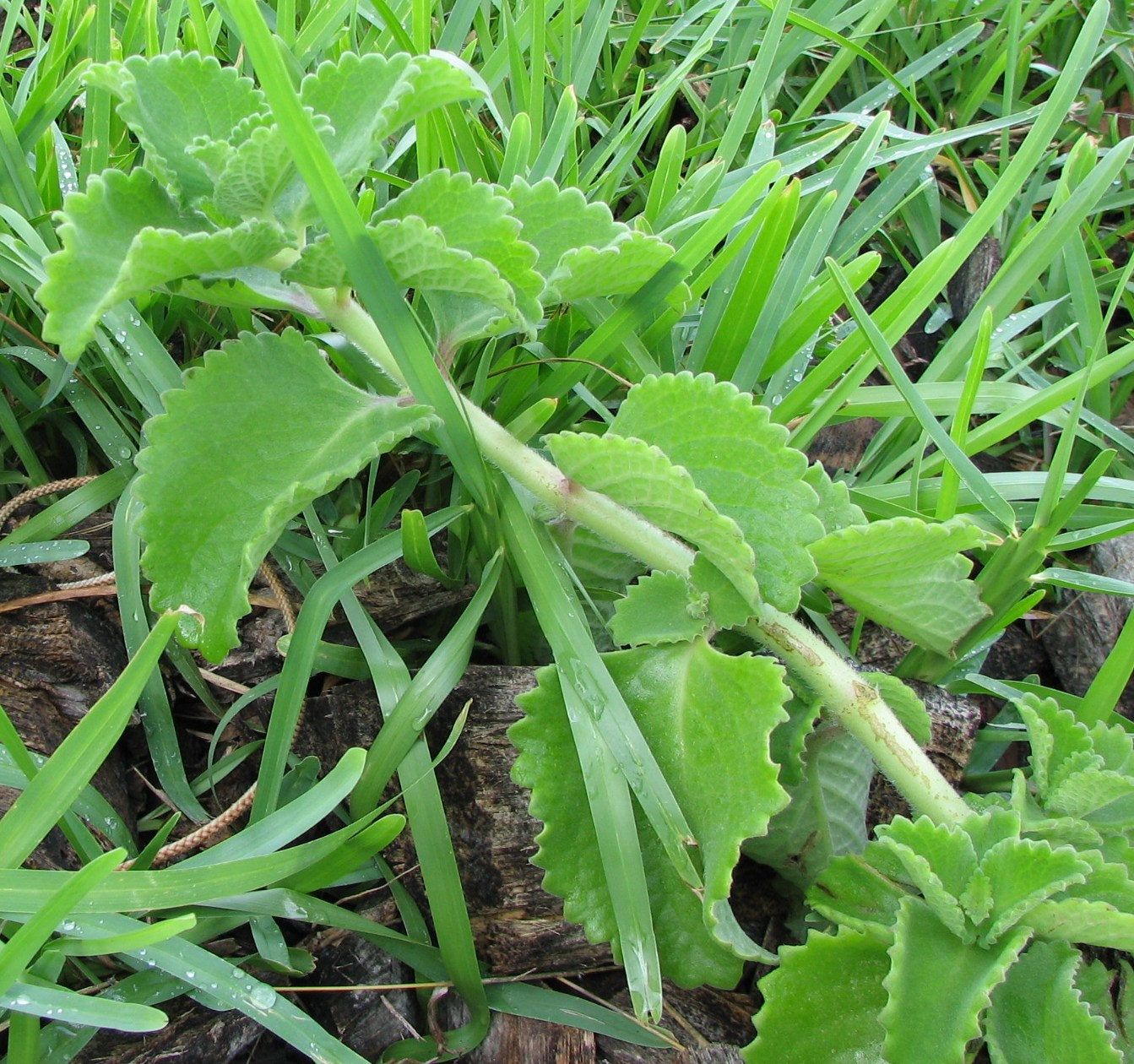
Coleus amboinicus

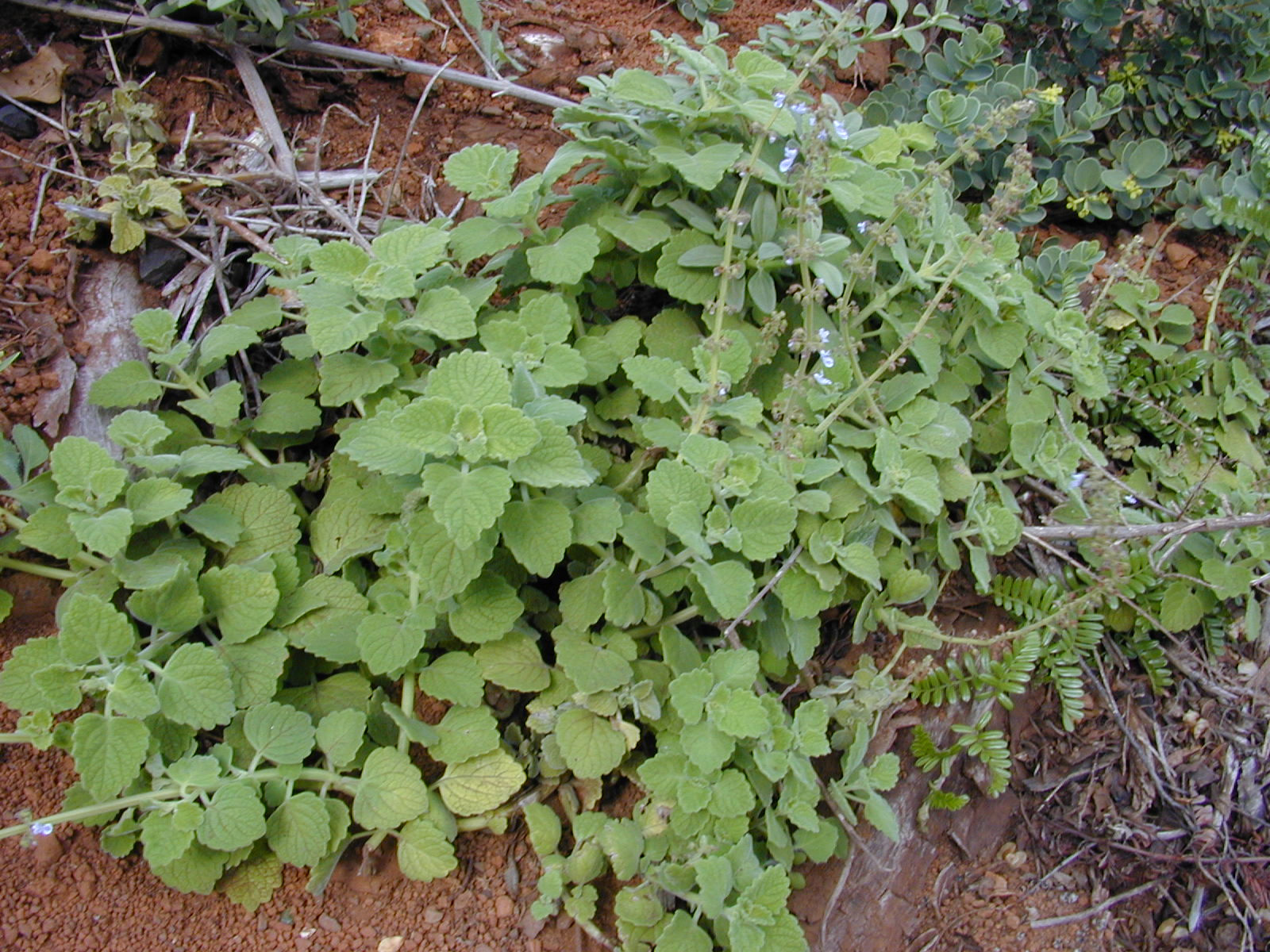
Coleus australis

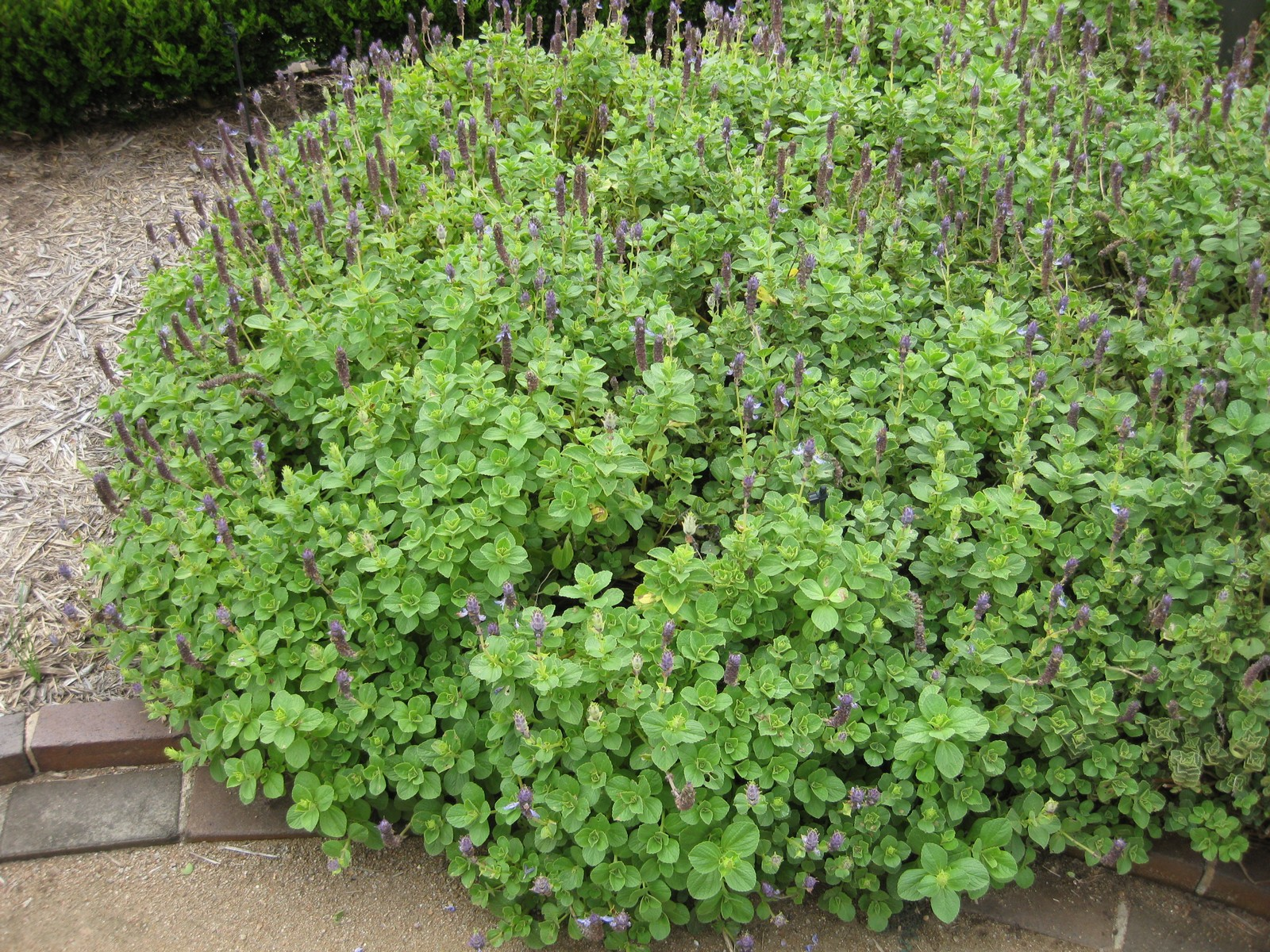
Coleus neochilus

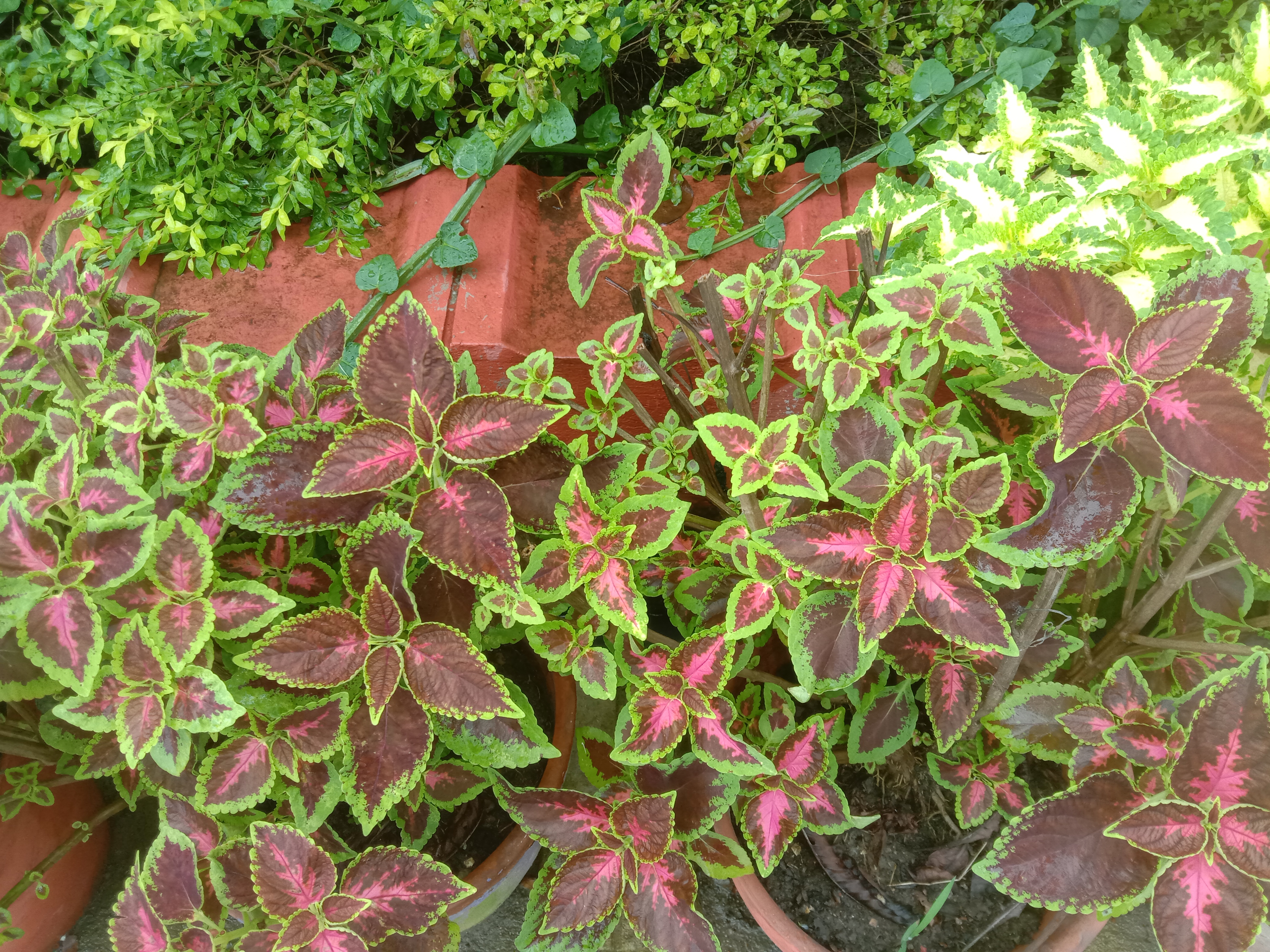
Cultivars in Monsoon, West Bengal, India
