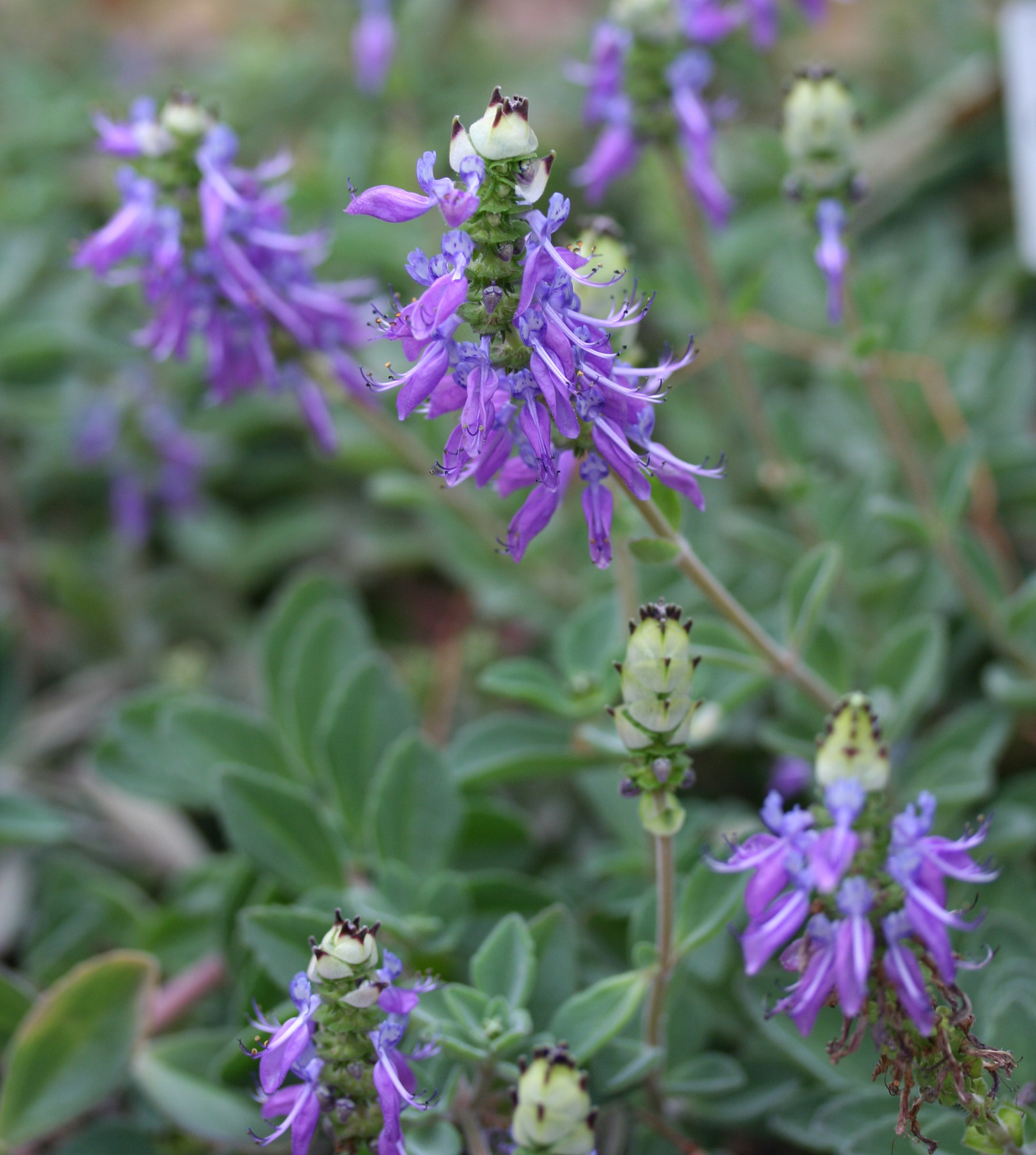

Scientific classification
- Kingdom: Plantae
- Clade: Tracheophytes
- Clade: Angiosperms
- Clade: Eudicots
- Clade: Asterids
- Order: Lamiales
- Family: Lamiaceae
- Genus: Coleus
- Species: C. comosus

Binomial name
- Coleus comosus Hochst. ex Gürke

Synonyms
- Plectranthus ornatus Codd

= Coleus comosus =

Species of flowering plant

Coleus comosus, synonym Plectranthus ornatus, is a flowering plant from the mint family Lamiaceae, native to eastern Africa (Eritrea, Ethiopia, Kenya, Tanzania and Uganda).

A plant sold under the name "Coleus canina" or "scaredy cat plant" is supposed to scare off cats and dogs. An attempt to register "Coleus canina" to receive plant variety protection failed as it was considered to be only a clone of Coleus comosus.
