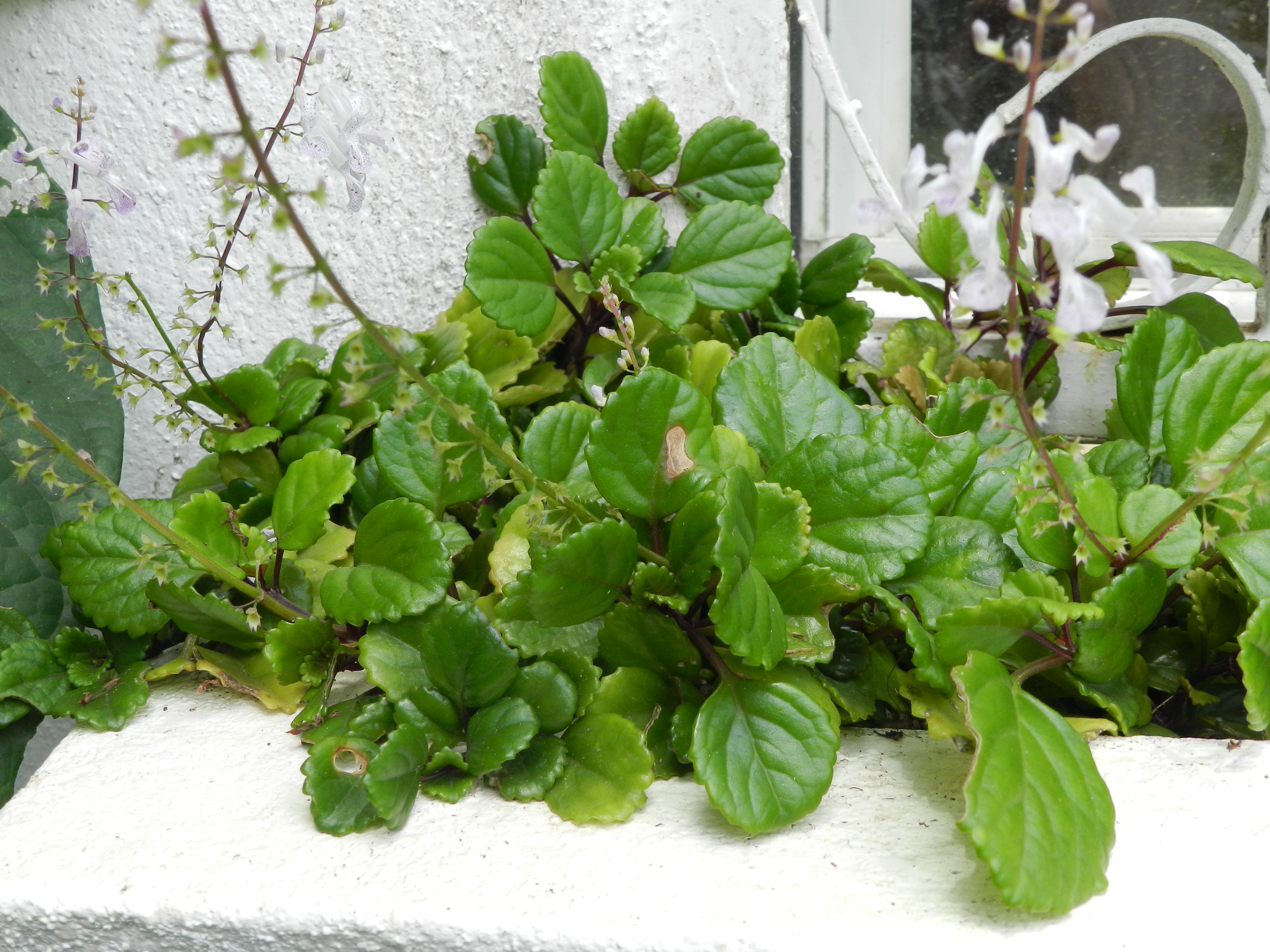

Scientific classification
- Kingdom: Plantae
- Clade: Tracheophytes
- Clade: Angiosperms
- Clade: Eudicots
- Clade: Asterids
- Order: Lamiales
- Family: Lamiaceae
- Genus: Plectranthus
- Species: P. verticillatus

Binomial name
- Plectranthus verticillatus (L.f.) Druce

Synonyms
- Plectranthus nummularius Briq.

= Plectranthus verticillatus =

Species of flowering plant

Plectranthus verticillatus (syn. Plectranthus nummularius), Swedish ivy, Swedish begonia or whorled plectranthus is a plant in the family Lamiaceae (Labiatae), genus Plectranthus native to southern Africa. Despite its common name, it is not close to the ivy family of the genus Hedera nor is it native to Sweden.

== Description ==
The plant has aromatic glossy, green, round leaves, which show a deep purple color in the center sometimes and tend to trail, reaching a height of between 10 and 30 cm and extends around 60 cm. This deep purple can also be found on the plant stems and on the underside of leaves. The leaves, which are widely serrated, are fleshy and rounded between 64 and 90 mm, with purple and hairy undersides with reddish sessile glands.

The upright racemes appear white, pale violet or pale pink and can sprout sporadically throughout the year (but more typically in spring and late autumn), which form verticillasters of 2-4 flowers and 2–3 mm bracts. The fruits are 1 mm nuts, brown in colour and wrinkled.

The name "Swedish ivy" is deceptive: the plant is not thigmotropic (meaning it does not cling to walls with the roots when it grows), is not native to Sweden, and is not closely related to the genus of ivy (Hedera). Some variegated, silvery plants called Swedish ivy grown in pots and hanging baskets are Plectranthus oertendahlii from coastal river gorges of KwaZulu-Natal.

== Distribution ==
Plectranthus verticillatus is native to southern Africa where it occurs in the Cape Provinces, KwaZulu-Natal, Eswatini, the Northern Provinces and southern Mozambique. It is found naturalized in El Salvador, Honduras, the Leeward Islands, the Venezuela Antilles, the Windward Islands, Venezuela, Puerto Rico, Hawaii as well as south-east Queensland and coastal areas of New South Wales in Australia.

== Use as ornamental plant ==
Plectranthus verticillatus is a robust plant doing well in indirect sunlight, mostly cultivated as hanging houseplant. In frost-free areas, it is also found as groundcover in gardens or sprouting down walls. It can tolerate milder frosts if it is grown under a canopy of trees and shrubs. Since it is a tender perennial, it is hardy to USDA zones 10-11. In cooler climates, it is grown as an indoor houseplant or as an annual.

It likes to stay moist and it also responds well to pruning. It can easily be rooted with cuttings and its vulnerability is low; but a weak plant can be infested with spider mites.

=== US White House ===
A notable specimen of Plectranthus verticillatus was long to be found above the mantel in the President of the United States' Oval Office. Though a popular story attributes its origins as a gift to President John F. Kennedy in 1961, the exact origins are unknown. It had been photographed in every administration since its appearance until it was removed by Donald Trump in 2025 and replaced with a series of gold objects. Interns, aides, and other White House workers are often granted clippings of the famous plant which they grow and further distribute to friends and family.

== Gallery ==
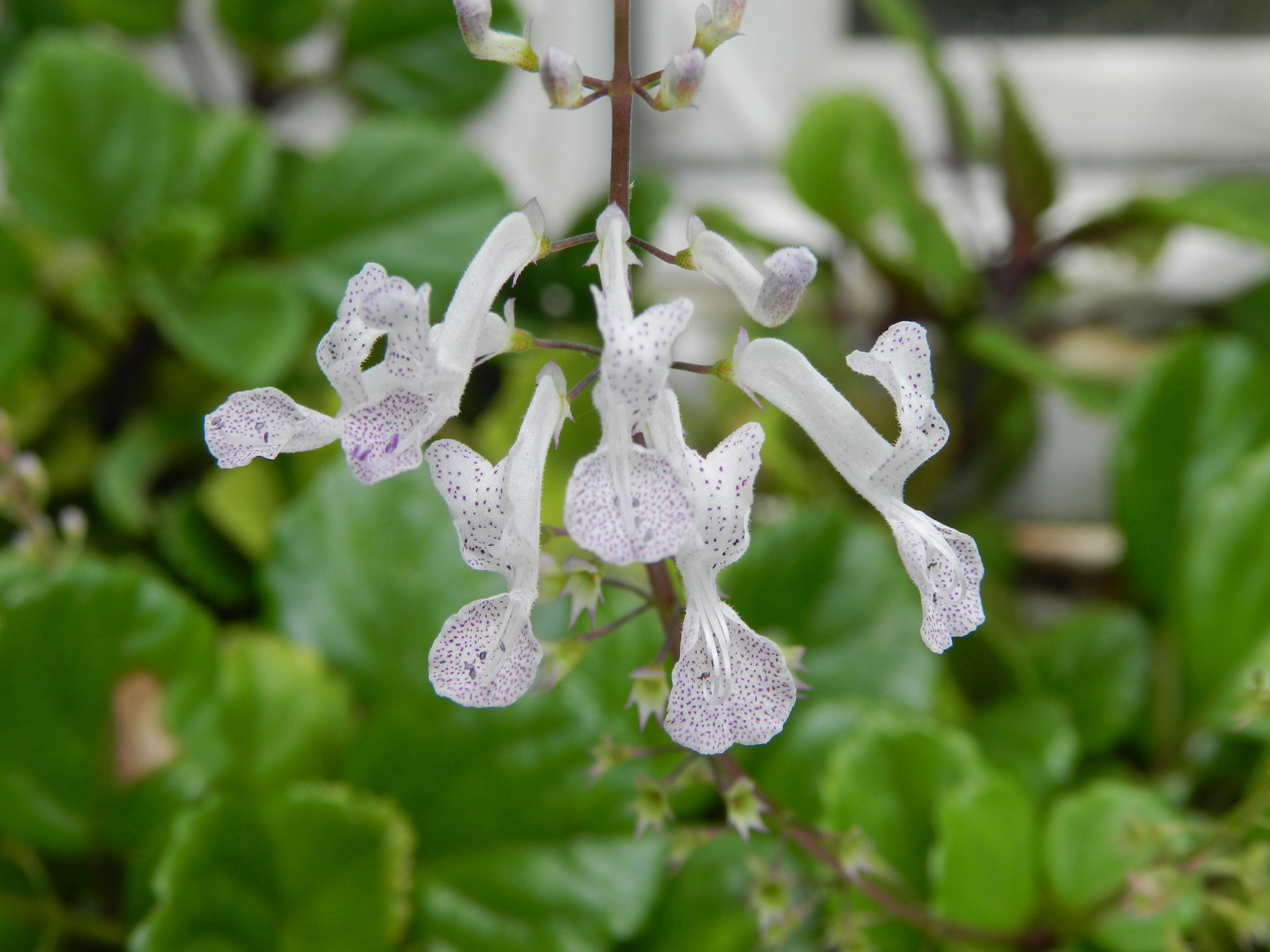
In cultivation, El Crucero, Managua, Nicaragua

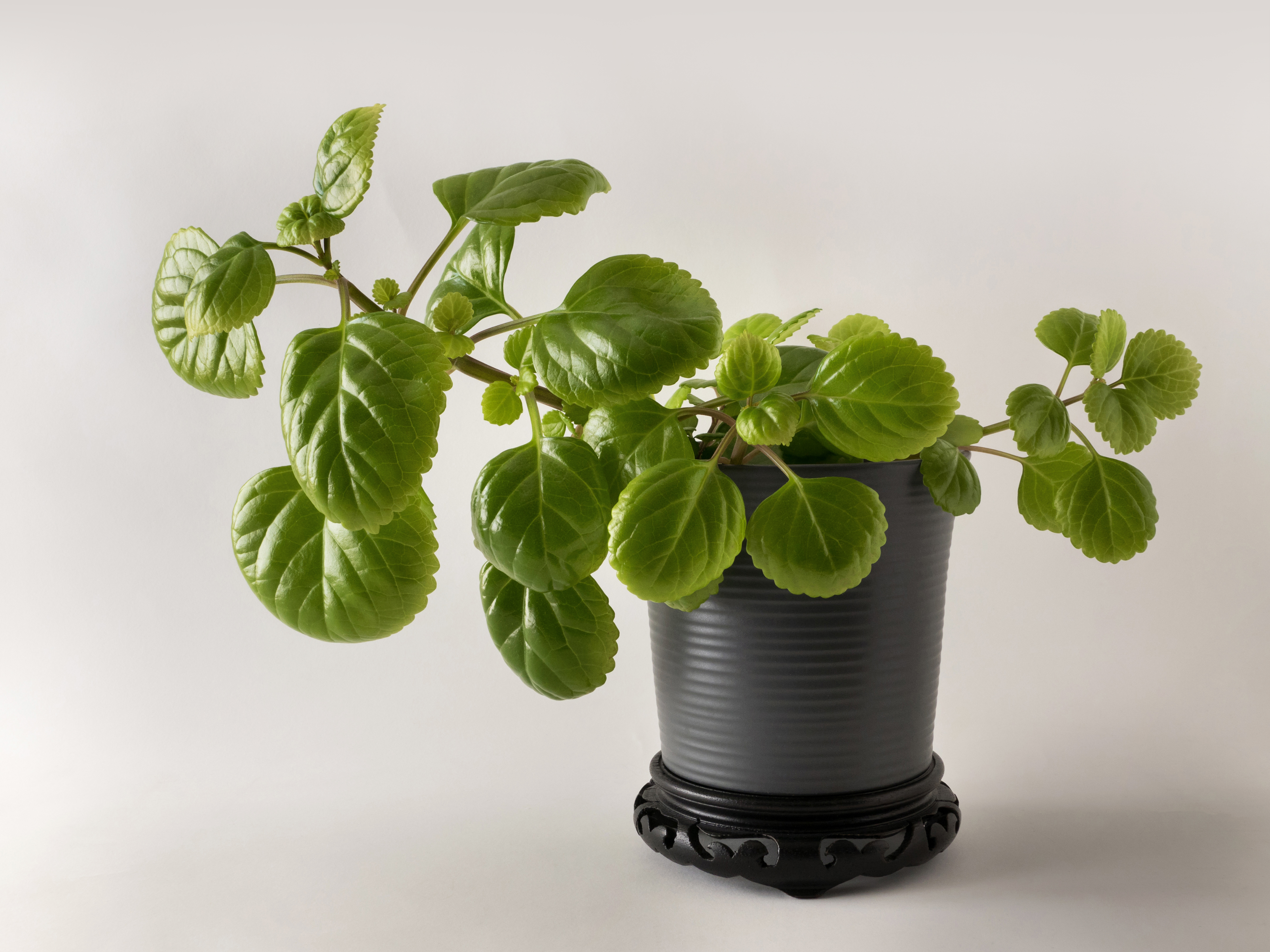
In a ceramic pot, grown from a cutting

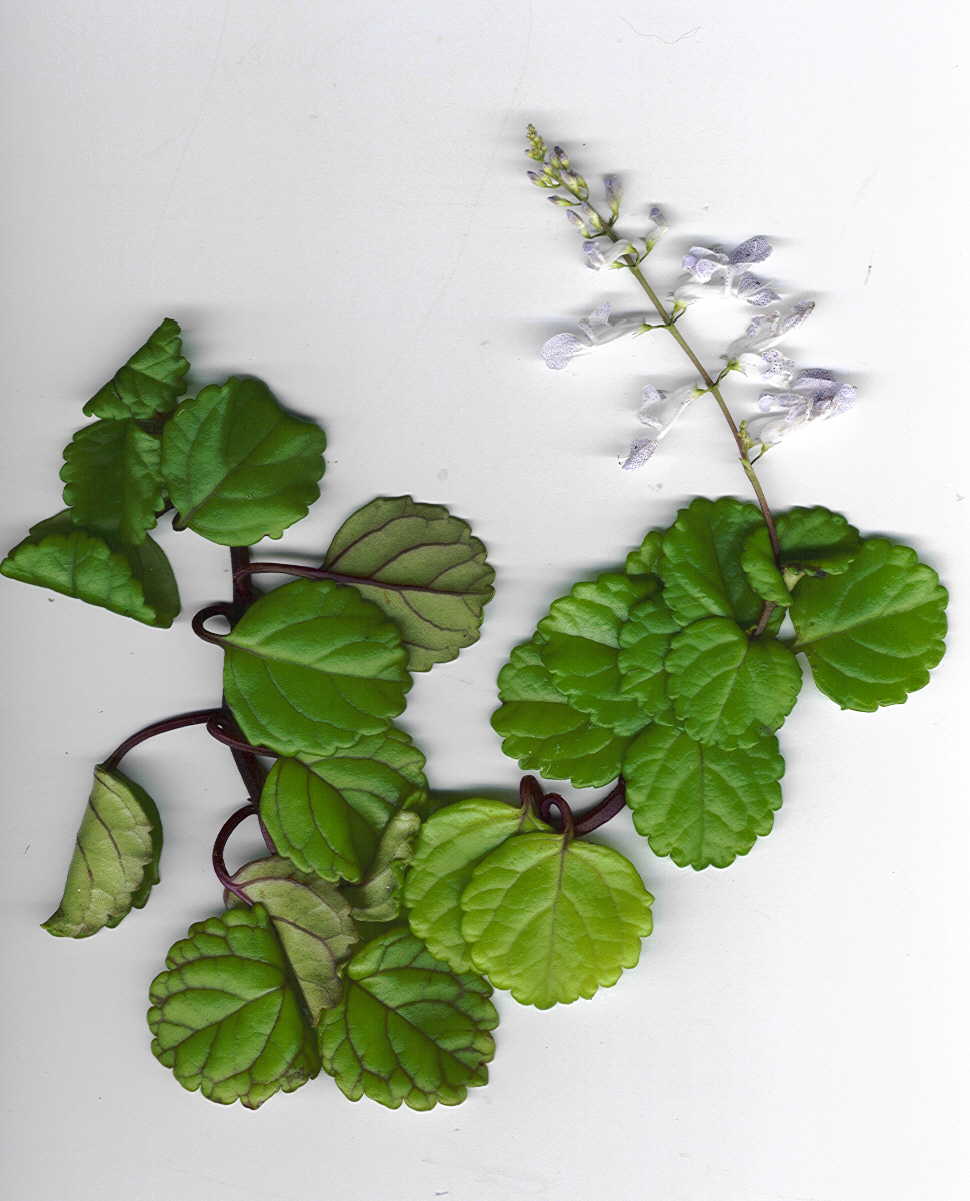
Foliage

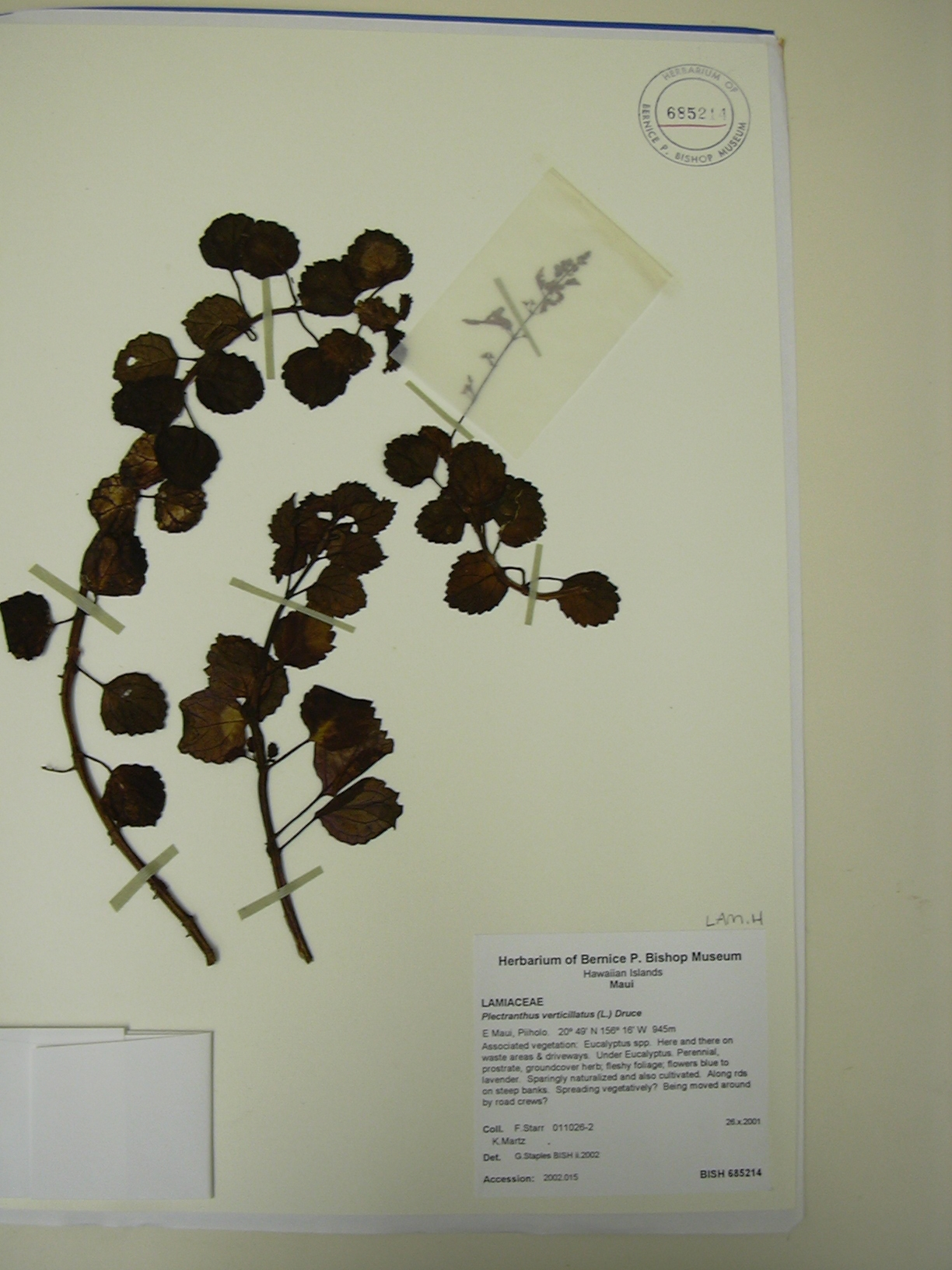
Botanical illustration

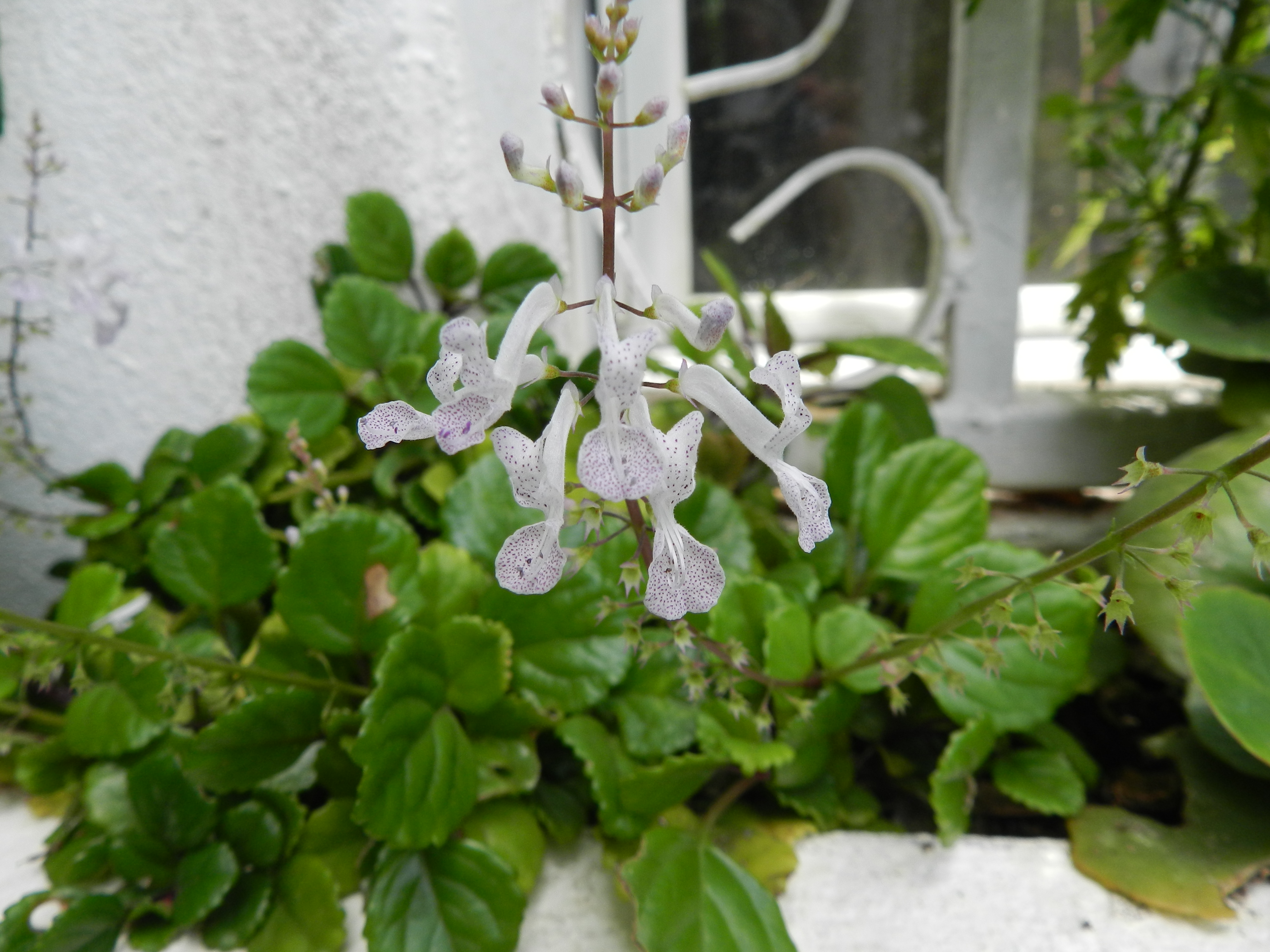
Flowers and leaves
