= Plectranthus purpuratus =

Scientific classification
- Kingdom: Plantae
- Clade: Embryophytes
- Clade: Tracheophytes
- Clade: Angiosperms
- Clade: Eudicots
- Clade: Asterids
- Order: Lamiales
- Family: Lamiaceae
- Genus: Plectranthus
- Species: P. purpuratus

Binomial name
- Plectranthus purpuratus Harv.

Species of flowering plant

Plectranthus purpuratus or cliff spurflower is a species of flowering plant in the family Lamiaceae. It is native to South Africa's Kwazulu-Natal and Mpumalanga provinces, as well as eSwatini. The name is frequently misapplied to Plectranthus ciliatus, presumably because both have purple-backed leaves.

== Description ==
A perennial, spreading or trailing succulent herb that grows up to 20 cm tall. The stems are four-angled and succulent. The leaves are broadly trullate, broadly ovate, obovate, or nearly round, measuring 10 to 15 mm in both length and width. The leaf edges can be smooth or variably serrated to crenate, sometimes with 2 or 3 pairs of teeth. The leaves are slightly hairy to mostly hairless. The underside of the leaves may occasionally appear purplish with red gland dots. The tips of the leaves are pointed, and the bases are either straight across or broadly wedge-shaped. The leaf stalks range from 3 to 15 mm long.

The flower cluster or raceme can measure anywhere from 30 to 290 mm in length. It is racemose in arrangement, occasionally having a pair of side branches. The individual flower clusters, called cymes, consist of 3 flowers and are spaced 5 to 10 mm apart. The bracts, which are linear-lanceolate in shape, measure 3 to 4 mm long and persist beyond the flowering stage. The flower stalks, or pedicels, are 3 to 5 mm long. The calyx, which surrounds the base of the flower, is 3 mm long, growing to 5 mm in the fruiting stage.

The corolla is 12 to 13 mm in length and can be white or pale mauve. The tube of the corolla is 5 to 8 millimeters long and is swollen at the base, narrowing about 3 mm from the bottom and flaring at the throat. The upper lobes of the corolla are slightly indented and measure 3 to 5 mm long. The lateral lobes are approximately 2 mm. The lower lip of the corolla is boat-shaped and measures 5 to 7 mm long. The nutlets, which are the seeds of the plant, are brown or black and are 1.5 millimeters long.

== Subtaxa ==
The following subspecies are accepted:

- Plectranthus purpuratus subsp. montanus van Jaarsv. & T.J.Edwards – Northern Provinces, Eswatini
- Plectranthus purpuratus subsp. purpuratus – KwaZulu-Natal
- Plectranthus purpuratus subsp. tongaensis van Jaarsv. & T.J.Edwards – KwaZulu-Natal
