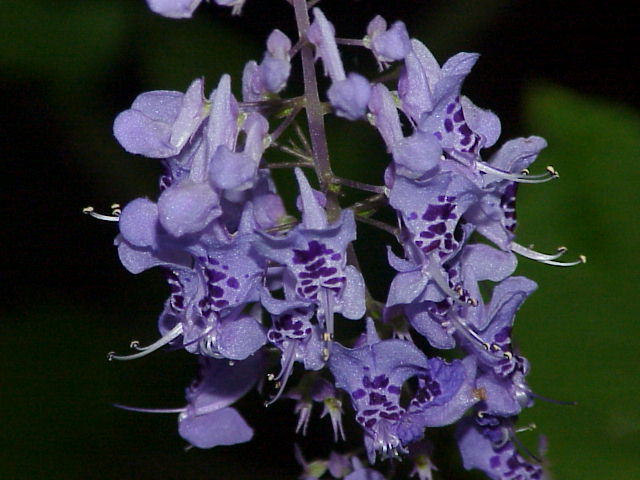
- Plectranthus fruticosus

Scientific classification
- Kingdom: Plantae
- Clade: Embryophytes
- Clade: Tracheophytes
- Clade: Spermatophytes
- Clade: Angiosperms
- Clade: Eudicots
- Clade: Asterids
- Order: Lamiales
- Family: Lamiaceae
- Subfamily: Nepetoideae
- Tribe: Ocimeae
- Genus: Plectranthus; L'Hér.

Species
- Many, see text

Synonyms
- Ascocarydion G.Taylor; Burnatastrum Briq. Capitanya Gürke; Dielsia Kudô; Englerastrum Briq. Germanea Lam. Holostylon Robyns & Lebrun; Isodictyophorus Briq. Leocus A.Chev. Neomuellera Briq. Perrierastrum Guillaumin; Symphostemon Hiern

= Plectranthus =

Family of shrubs

Plectranthus is a genus of about 85 species of flowering plants from the mint/sage family, Lamiaceae, found mostly in southern and tropical Africa and Madagascar. Common names include spur-flower. Plectranthus species are herbaceous perennial plants, rarely annuals or soft-wooded shrubs, sometimes succulent; sometimes with a tuberous base.

Several species are grown as ornamental plants. The cultivar Mona Lavender = 'Plepalila' has received the Royal Horticultural Society's Award of Garden Merit.

Recent phylogenetic analysis found Plectranthus to be paraphyletic with respect to Coleus, Solenostemon, Pycnostachys and Anisochilus. The most recent treatment of the genus resurrected the genus Coleus, and 212 names were changed from combinations in Plectranthus, Pycnostachys and Anisochilus. Equilabium was segregated from Plectranthus, after phylogenetic studies supported its recognition as a phylogenetically distinct genus.

== Etymology ==
The word plectranthus derives from the Greek πλῆκτρον (plēktron), "anything to strike with, an instrument for striking the lyre, a spear point" + ἄνθος (anthos), "blossom, flower".

== Species ==
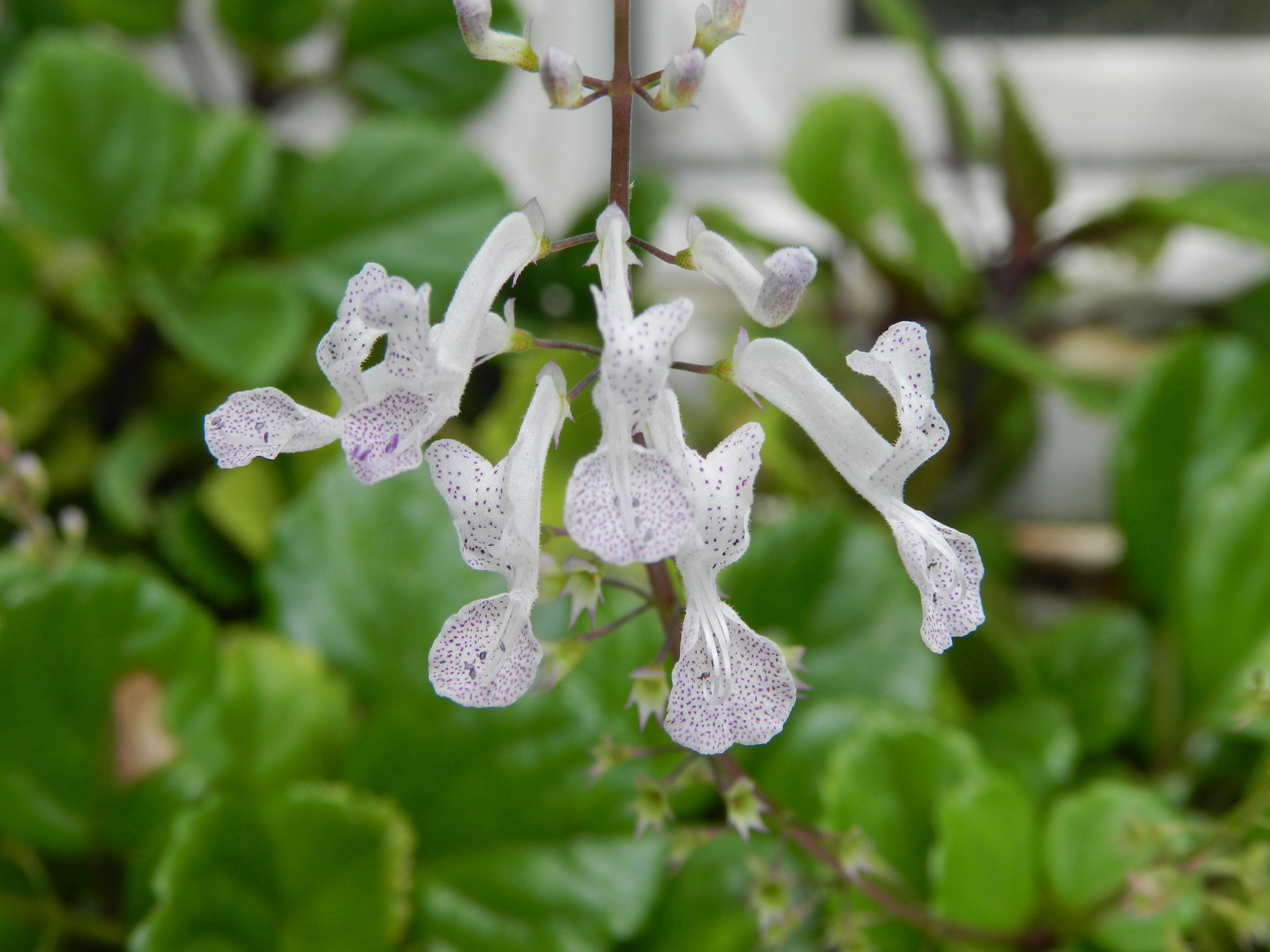
Plectranthus verticillatus in cultivation

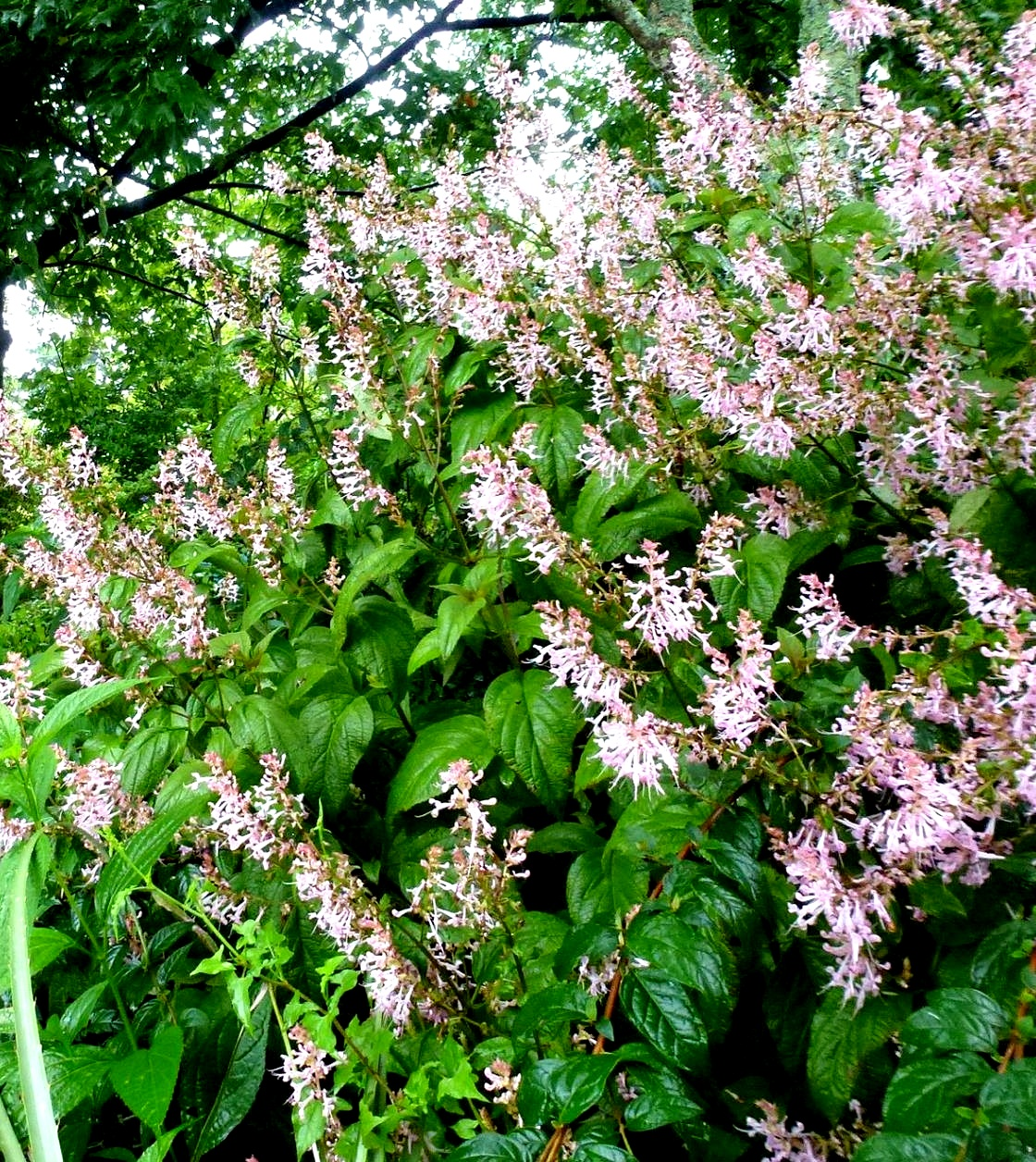
Plectranthus ecklonii in cultivation

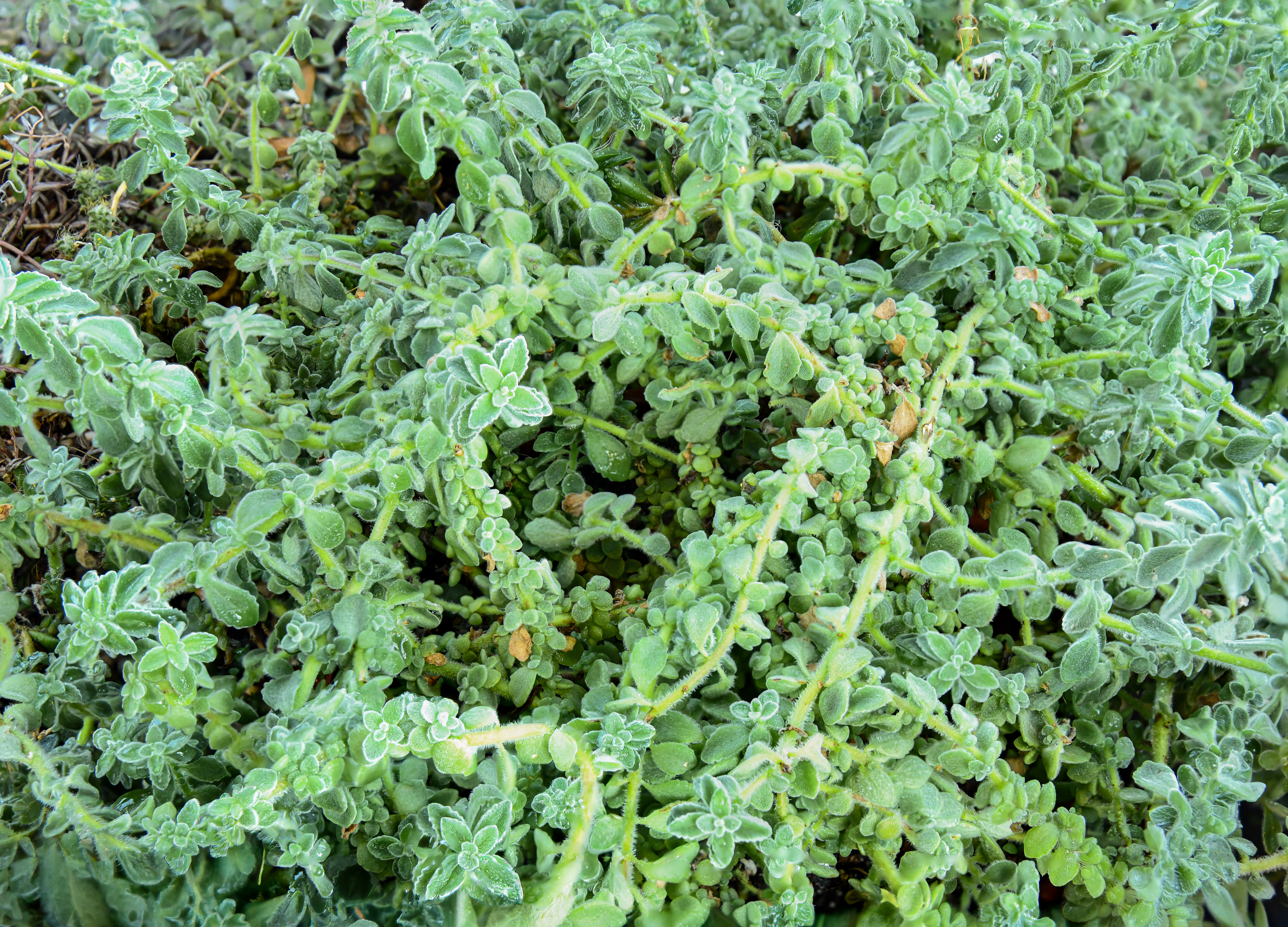
Plectranthus'Cerveza'n Lime' in cultivation

Paton et al. (2019) listed 72 species. As of October 2022, Plants of the World Online accepted 84:

- Plectranthus alboviolaceus Gürke – South Africa: E. Cape Prov. to N. KwaZulu-Natal
- Plectranthus ambiguus (Bolus) Codd – South Africa: E. Cape Prov. to N. KwaZulu-Natal
- Plectranthus amplexicaulis Hedge – Madagascar
- Plectranthus antongilicus Hedge – Madagascar
- Plectranthus asymmetricus A.J.Paton – Zambia
- Plectranthus atroviolaceus Hedge – Madagascar
- Plectranthus aulihanensis (Schweinf. & Volkens) ined.
- Plectranthus betamponus Hedge – Madagascar
- Plectranthus bracteolatus A.J.Paton – Tanzania
- Plectranthus brevicaulis (Baker) Hedge – Madagascar
- Plectranthus brevimentus T.J.Edwards (also as P. brevimentum) – South Africa: Eastern Cape Prov
- Plectranthus canescens Benth. – Madagascar
- Plectranthus capuronii Hedge – Madagascar
- Plectranthus chimanimanensis S.Moore – E. Zimbabwe to W. Mozambique
- Plectranthus ciliatus E.Mey. – South Africa and Eswatini
- Plectranthus clementiae Hedge – Madagascar
- Plectranthus cordatus A.J.Paton & Phillipson – Madagascar
- Plectranthus decaryi Hedge – Madagascar
- Plectranthus delicatissimus Hedge – Madagascar
- Plectranthus ecklonii Benth. – South Africa
- Plectranthus elegans Britten – S. Malawi
- Plectranthus elegantulus Briq. – South Africa: KwaZulu-Natal
- Plectranthus ellipticus Hedge – Madagascar
- Plectranthus emirnensis (Baker) Hedge – Madagascar
- Plectranthus ernstii Codd – South Africa: E. Cape Prov. to S. KwaZulu-Natal
- Plectranthus forsythii Hedge – Madagascar
- Plectranthus fruticosus L’Hér. – S. Mozambique to South Africa
- Plectranthus gardneri Thwaites – Sri Lanka
- Plectranthus gibbosus Hedge – Madagascar
- Plectranthus godefroyae (N.E.Br.) ined.
- Plectranthus grallatus Briq. – South Africa, Lesotho
- Plectranthus grandibracteatus Hedge – Madagascar
- Plectranthus guruensis A.J.Paton – Mozambique
- Plectranthus hexaphyllus Baker – Madagascar
- Plectranthus hilliardiae Codd – South Africa: Transkei to KwaZulu-Natal
- Plectranthus hirsutus Hedge – Madagascar
- Plectranthus hoslundioides Scott-Elliot – Madagascar
- Plectranthus humbertii Hedge – Madagascar
- Plectranthus incrassatus Hedge – Madagascar
- Plectranthus laurifolius Hedge – Madagascar
- Plectranthus linearis Hedge – Madagascar
- Plectranthus longiflorus Benth. – Madagascar
- Plectranthus longipetiolatus Hedge – Madagascar
- Plectranthus lucidus (Benth.) van Jaarsv. & T.J.Edwards – South Africa: S. Cape Prov
- Plectranthus macilentus Hedge – Madagascar
- Plectranthus malvinus van Jaarsv. & T.J.Edwards – South Africa: E. Cape Prov
- Plectranthus mandalensis Baker – Malawi (Mt. Mulanje), Mozambique (Mt. Namuli)
- Plectranthus marquesii Gürke
- Plectranthus mechowianus (Briq.) ined.
- Plectranthus membranaceus (Scott-Elliot) Hedge – Madagascar
- Plectranthus miserabilis Briq.
- Plectranthus mocquerysii Briq. – Madagascar
- Plectranthus mzimvubuensis van Jaarsv. – South Africa: SE. Cape Prov
- Plectranthus oblanceolatus Hedge – Madagascar
- Plectranthus oertendahlii T.C.E.Fr. – South Africa: S. KwaZulu-Natal
- Plectranthus ombrophilus Hedge – Madagascar
- Plectranthus oribiensis Codd – South Africa: KwaZulu-Natal
- Plectranthus papilionaceus Ranir. & Phillipson – Madagascar
- Plectranthus pichompae Hedge – Madagascar
- Plectranthus poggeanus (Briq.) ined.
- Plectranthus praetermissus Codd – South Africa: SE. Cape Prov
- Plectranthus preussii (Gürke) ined.
- Plectranthus purpuratus Harv. – South Africa
- Plectranthus reflexus van Jaarsv. & T.J.Edwards – South Africa: SE. Cape Prov
- Plectranthus rosulatus Hedge – NW. Madagascar
- Plectranthus rubropunctatus Codd – South Africa: Limpopo to Eswatini
- Plectranthus rubroviolaceus Hedge – Madagascar
- Plectranthus saccatus Benth. – South Africa: SE. Cape Prov. to KwaZulu-Natal
- Plectranthus scaposus Hedge – Madagascar
- Plectranthus schweinfurthii Sprenger
- Plectranthus secundiflorus (Baker) Hedge – Tanzania (Uluguru Mts.)
- Plectranthus strangulatus A.J.Paton – Tanzania (Uluguru Mts.)
- Plectranthus strigosus Benth. ex E.Mey. – South Africa: S. Cape Prov
- Plectranthus stylesii T.J.Edwards – South Africa: Eastern Cape Prov
- Plectranthus swynnertonii S.Moore – S. Trop. Africa to South Africa, Mpumalanga
- Plectranthus termiticola A.J.Paton
- Plectranthus trilobus Hedge – Madagascar
- Plectranthus verticillatus (L.f.) Druce – S. Mozambique to South Africa
- Plectranthus vestitus Benth. – Madagascar
- Plectranthus vinaceus Hedge – Madagascar
- Plectranthus viridis (Briq.) ined.
- Plectranthus zenkeri Gürke
- Plectranthus zuluensis T.Cooke – South Africa: SE. Cape Prov. to Eswatini

=== Transferred to Coleus ===
Species transferred to Coleus in 2019 include:

- Plectranthus amboinicus (Lour.) Spreng. → Coleus amboinicus
- Plectranthus argentatus S.T.Blake → Coleus argentatus
- Plectranthus barbatus Andrews → Coleus barbatus
- Plectranthus caninus Roth → Coleus caninus
- Plectranthus cataractarum B.J.Pollard → Coleus cataractarum
- Plectranthus cremnus B.J.Conn → Coleus cremnus
- Plectranthus dissitiflorus (Guerke) J.K.Morton → Coleus dissitiflorus
- Plectranthus edulis (Vatke) Agnew → Coleus maculosus subsp. edulis
- Plectranthus esculentus N.E.Br. → Coleus esculentus
- Plectranthus graveolens R.Br. → Coleus graveolens
- Plectranthus hadiensis (Forssk.) Schweinf. ex Sprenger → Coleus hadiensis
- Plectranthus neochilus Schltr. → Coleus neochilus
- Plectranthus ornatus Codd → Coleus comosus
- Plectranthus parviflorus Willd. → Coleus australis
- Plectranthus rotundifolius (Poir.) Spreng. → Coleus rotundifolius
- Plectranthus scutellarioides (L.) R.Br. → Coleus scutellarioides
- Plectranthus socotranus Radcl.-Sm. → Coleus socotranus
- Plectranthus unguentarius Codd → Coleus unguentarius
- Plectranthus welwitschii (Briq.) Codd → Coleus fredericii

=== Other species formerly placed in Plectranthus ===
- Anisochilus carnosus (L. f.) Wall. ex Benth. (as P. strobilifer Roxb.)
- Capitanopsis oreophila (Hedge) Mwany., A.J.Paton & Culham (as P. bipinnatus A.J.Paton)
- Isodon coetsa (Buch.-Ham. ex D.Don) Kudô (as P. coetsa Buch.-Ham. ex D.Don)
- Isodon inflexus (Thunb.) Kudô (as P. inflexus (Thunb.) Vahl ex Benth.)
- Isodon lophanthoides (Buch.-Ham. ex D.Don) H.Hara (as P. striatus Benth.)
- Isodon rugosus (Wall. ex Benth.) Codd (as P. rugosus Wall. ex Benth.)
- Isodon sculponeatus (Vaniot) Kudô (as P. sculponeatus Vaniot)
- Tetradenia riparia Hochstetter and Codd (as P. riparius A.Rich.)
