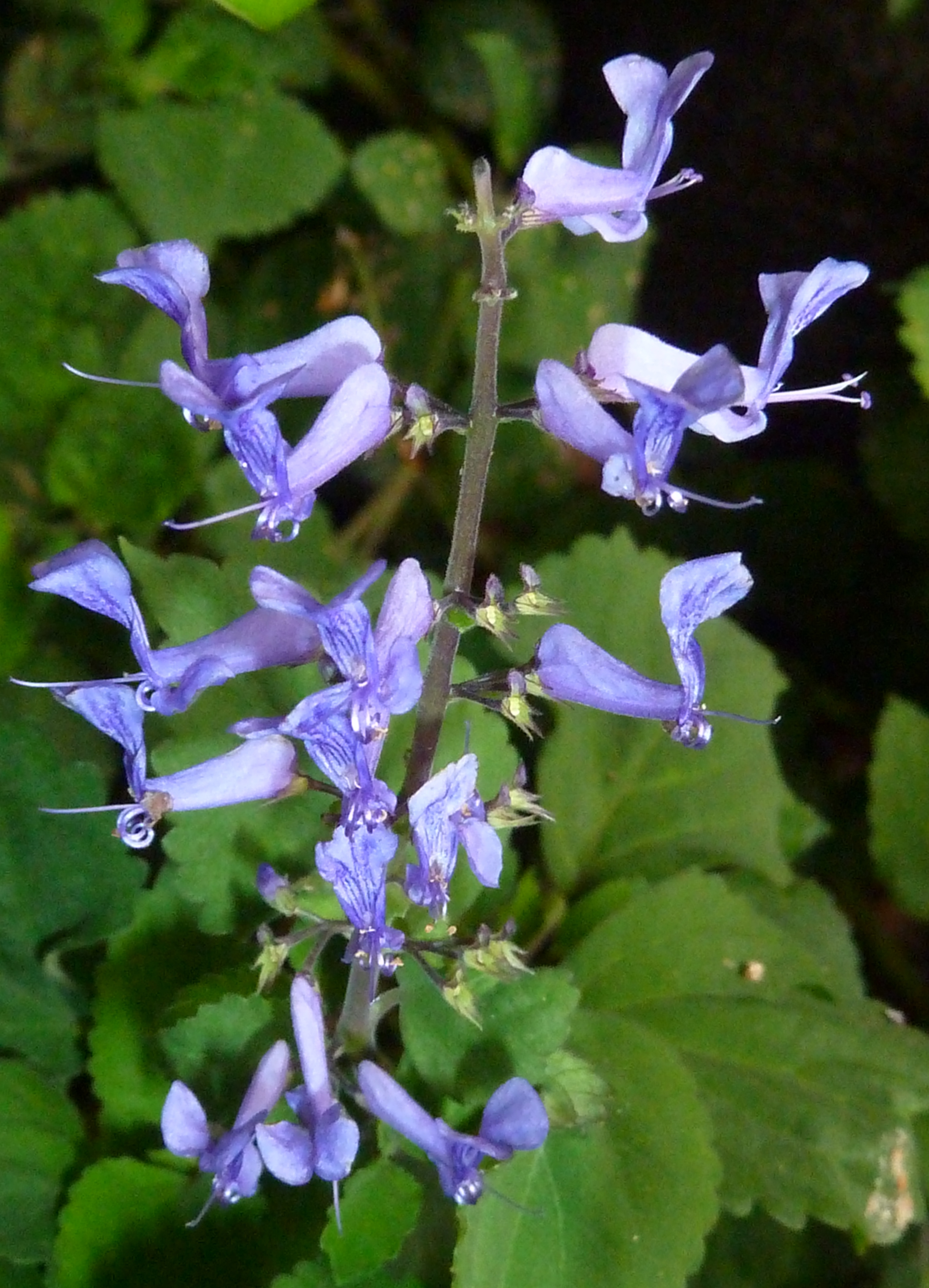

Scientific classification
- Kingdom: Plantae
- Clade: Tracheophytes
- Clade: Angiosperms
- Clade: Eudicots
- Clade: Asterids
- Order: Lamiales
- Family: Lamiaceae
- Genus: Plectranthus
- Species: P. zuluensis

Binomial name
- Plectranthus zuluensis T.Cooke

= Plectranthus zuluensis =

Species of flowering plant

Plectranthus zuluensis, the Zulu spurflower, is a species of flowering plant in the mint family Lamiaceae, native to southern Africa. A tender perennial, it produces spikes of pale blue or mauve flowers against lime green foliage in spring.

In temperate climates it needs to be grown under glass, or protected from winter frosts if kept outside. It is suitable as a houseplant or conservatory plant.
