= Oval Office Swedish ivy =

Plant in presidential office in the White House

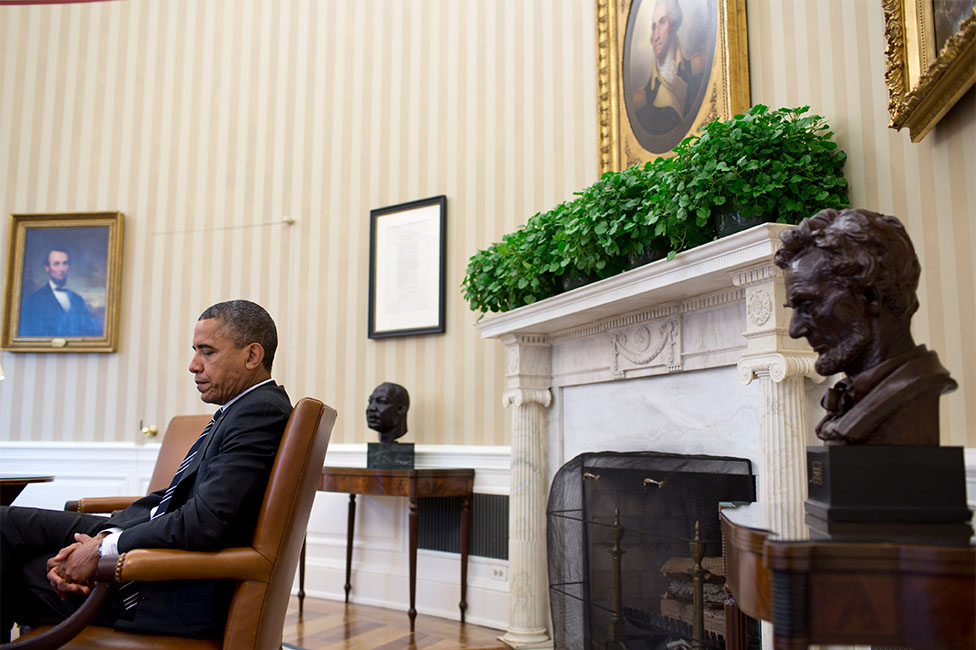
Barack Obama sitting in front of the ivy in 2012

A Swedish ivy (Plectranthus verticillatus) plant decorated the Oval Office of the United States White House from the mid-20th century until 2025. Though a popular story attributes the plant's origins to John F. Kennedy, the exact origins of the ivy are unknown. The plant was located on top of the Oval Office's fireplace mantle, and different presidents used different arrangements and numbers of the Swedish ivy over the years. The plant was removed to the White House greenhouse out of public view during Donald Trump's 2025 redecoration of the office, and replaced with a collection of golden objects.

The plant has been noted by White House horticulturalists as particularly resilient and resistant to pests. Propagations of the plant have historically been a popular gift to White House staffers, who have in turn spread the gift to growers around the United States. The plant features prominently in Barack Obama and Bill Clinton's presidential portraits, and was described as an Oval Office "fixture" and America's "most famous houseplant" prior to its removal.

== Plant ==
The plant is a Plectranthus verticillatus, commonly known as a Swedish ivy. Despite the common name, the plant is not an ivy, instead classified among the Lamiaceae family of mint and sage plants. It sat on the fireplace mantel of the Oval Office, and various pots of the ivy rotated through the office, growing in a greenhouse when they were not on display. According to Dale Haney, a longtime White House horticulturalist, every "few months" the plant would be switched with another propagation of the ivy. While one propagation of the ivy was on display in the Oval Office, a second was recuperating in the White House greenhouse. After around five rotations, a plant would be retired and replaced.

According to Haney, the plant "love[d] the light" that it got from the window to the White House Rose Garden to the plant's left. The ivy's location on the mantel, directly beneath Charles Willson Peale's presidential portrait of George Washington, was noted as putting it directly in the president's line of sight from their seat at the office's desk. According to a 1984 interview given by Haney, the plant's care routine included watering every morning at 7 am, feeding once a month with 20-20-20 fertilizer, misting once every six weeks, and occasional trimming to prevent it from blocking the view of the Washington portrait. In the interview, Haney also stated that retired plants were replanted in the White House's East Lawn.

== History ==
=== Origin ===
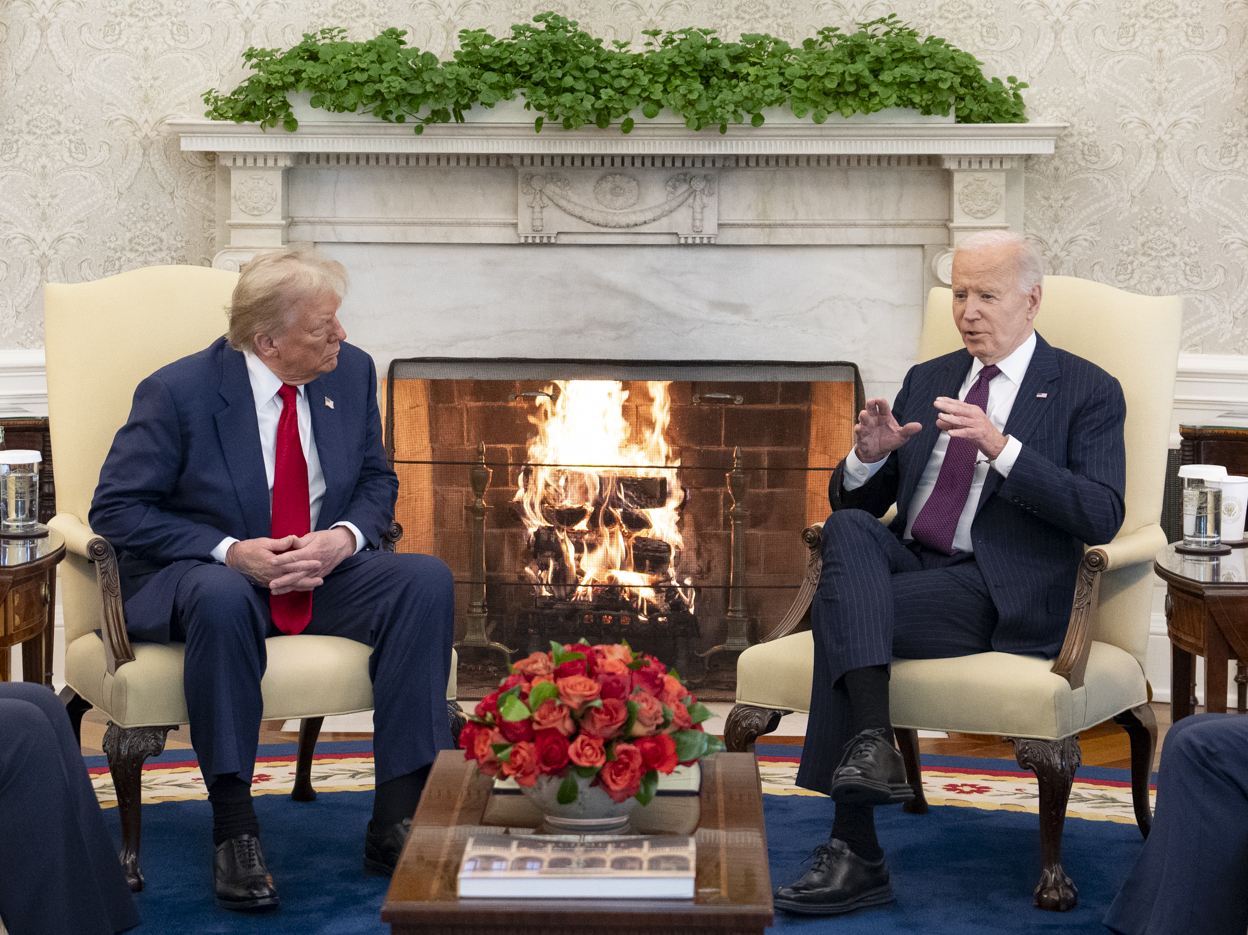
The Oval Office Swedish ivy prominently visible on the mantle during a November 2024 meeting between Donald Trump and Joe Biden.

The plant's exact origin is unknown. According to a popular story told by Bill Clinton amongst others, the plant was originally given as a gift to President John F. Kennedy in 1961 by Thomas J. Kiernan, then the Irish ambassador to the United States. Historical accounts have called this story into question, however, with archivists at the John F. Kennedy presidential library unable to confirm the story's veracity and Barbara Ann Perry, a Kennedy biographer, noting that the ivy only started appearing in photos during the presidency of Gerald Ford (1974–1977).

According to Stephen Bauer, a former White House staffer, the plant was added to the Oval Office as part of a redecoration effort by Betty Ford, Gerald Ford's wife and First Lady. A 1984 article in Time Magazine interviewed Irvin Williams, the White House Chief Horticulturalist from 1962–2008, and stated that the plant appeared under Kennedy. Williams said that prior to the introduction of the Swedish Ivy, grape ivy and philodendrons were used to decorate the mantel during Dwight Eisenhower's presidency and that, "At first we used [the Swedish Ivy] strictly experimentally." The plant eventually gained preference because, according to Haney, "You need something with a little body there on the mantel."

=== Usage ===
While it is common for a new incoming president to redecorate the Oval Office to suit their tastes, the ivy remained in the Oval Office through every administration following its introduction to the mantel until its removal in 2025. Different presidents kept the plants in varying forms and levels of prunage, with Gerald Ford and Jimmy Carter keeping a bushier plant and the ivy taking on a more pruned appearance during the Ronald Reagan and George H. W. Bush administrations. There was also variance in the number of pots of the plant used, with some presidential administrations using a single pot of the plant and some using multiple pots.

The plant has been noted for being photographed alongside numerous presidents and important historical figures, such as Nelson Mandela and Yitzhak Rabin, as well as important historic events, including Ronald Reagan's meeting with Mikhail Gorbachev. Some White House staffers have been dismissive of the plant — Sheila Tate could not understand why people were interested in seeing the plant, and noted that Larry Speakes thought enthusiasm for the ivy was, "all pretty silly." During the Obama administration, the Swedish ivy was briefly swapped out for grape ivy before the original Swedish ivy was returned to the office. During Donald Trump's first presidency, the plant was divided into two smaller plants for display, and remained on the mantle throughout the term.

=== Removal ===
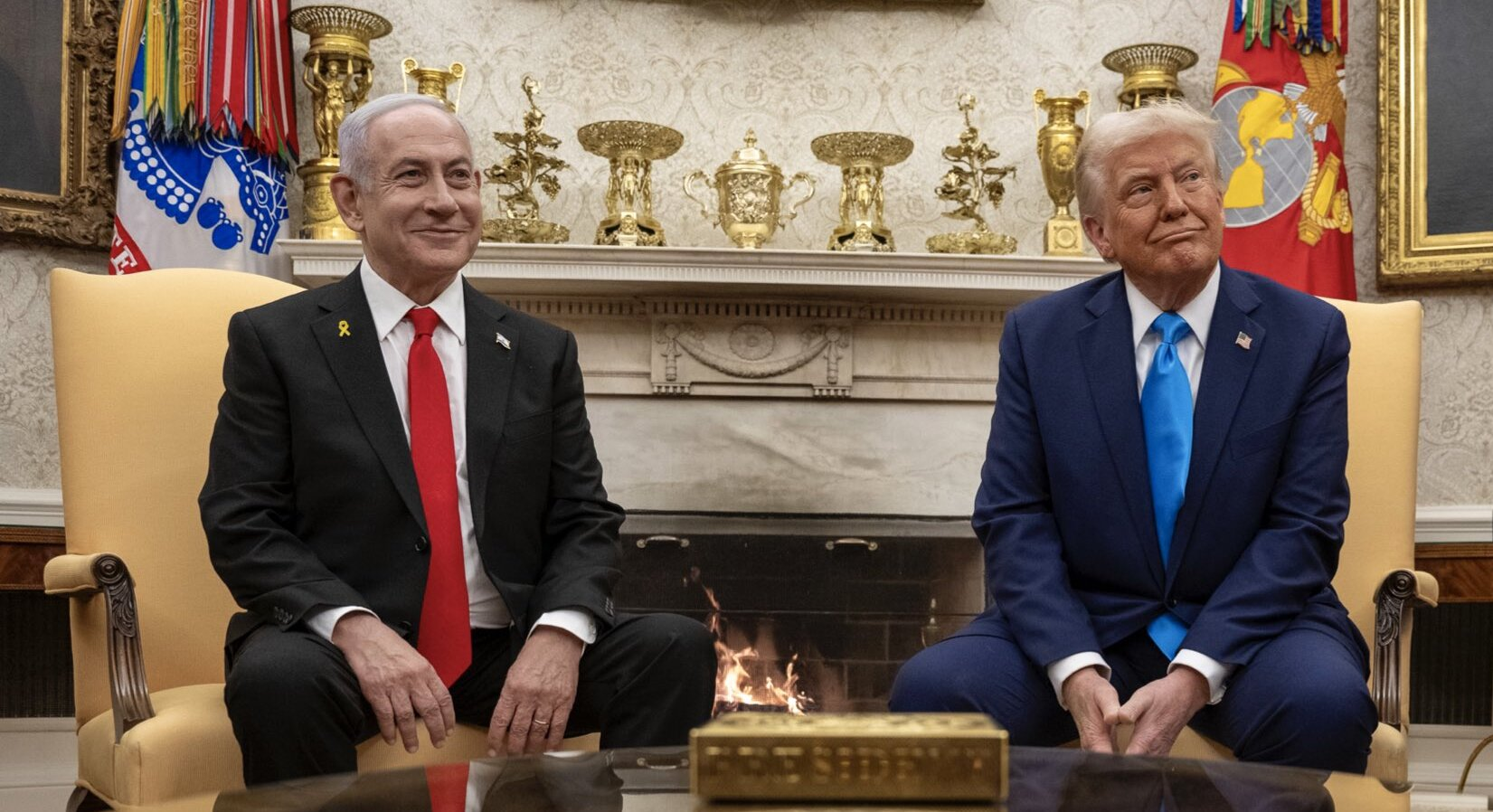
Donald Trump meets with Benjamin Netanyahu on February 4, 2025. The gold objects which replaced the ivy are visible.

Towards the start of Donald Trump's second presidency, as part of his redecoration of the Oval Office, the plant was removed from the mantel and replaced with a series of gold ornaments. The removal was first noticed during Trump's meeting with Benjamin Netanyahu on February 4, 2025. One of the first to make note of the disappearance was Thomas Sneeringer, who noticed the plant was missing in an image of the meeting published by The Washington Post. A letter to the editor about the disappearance from Sneeringer was published in the Post on February 21. Some writers and online users, including Sneeringer, speculated that the gold objects were golf trophies, as Trump has a reputation as a fan of the sport, but they were confirmed by the Washington Post to be historical objects, including urns and tableware from past presidents.

The White House did not initially respond to questions on the plant's whereabouts, but on March 18, 2025, they confirmed it had been withdrawn out of public view to the White House greenhouse where pots of the ivy had previously been kept when not on display. Journalist Gabriela Riccardi, who had previously written on the plant, mourned its removal, saying, "It’s a heartbreaker... I think it’s just such a beautiful tradition." Some commentators critical of Trump argued that the removal of the plant was symbolic of his presidency. Mother Jones wrote that the plant's removal was "emblematic of Trump's assault on the federal government," arguing that the plant had been "subjected to [Trump]'s Midas touch." Columnist Maura Judkis wrote on Trump and the replacement of the ivy, "It's a metaphor — a metaphor that's corny and obvious, yes, but also needed."

== In popular culture ==
The plant has been featured in two presidential portraits, those of Bill Clinton and Barack Obama. In Nelson Shanks's presidential portrait of Clinton, Clinton leans on the mantle next to the ivy. In Kehinde Wiley's portrait of Barack Obama, the background is filled with a stylized, overgrown ivy.

Propagations of the Oval Office Swedish ivy have historically been a common gift to White House staffers, and have spread from further propagations of those plants to growers around the United States. Rico Gardaphe, a former communications staffer for the Obama administration, was given a propagation of the plant and as of 2025 was running an Instagram account dedicated to the Oval Office Swedish ivy.

== Reactions ==
Architect Tyler Survant described the plant as one of the objects that had "earned the status of fixtures" in the Oval Office through reuse across administrations, alongside the Resolute desk and Oval Office grandfather clock. It has been variously described as America's "most famous houseplant" and "one of the most powerful plants on the globe". A 1984 Time magazine article about the plant speculatively wrote that, "No other [plant] in history has been more photographed".

Dale Haney described the plant as "amazing", emphasizing its resilience and ability to resist pests. In 2022, essayist Jamie Kirkpatrick wrote on the Oval Office Swedish ivy after anonymously being gifted a propagation, writing "Swedish ivy, like its more traditional ivy cousins, represents many things, among them eternity, fidelity, commitment, and loyalty. I'd like to think that all the men and women who are gathering in the Oval Office during these difficult days can breathe in some of those very same qualities and put them to work for the common good."

== Gallery ==
Oval Office Swedish ivy
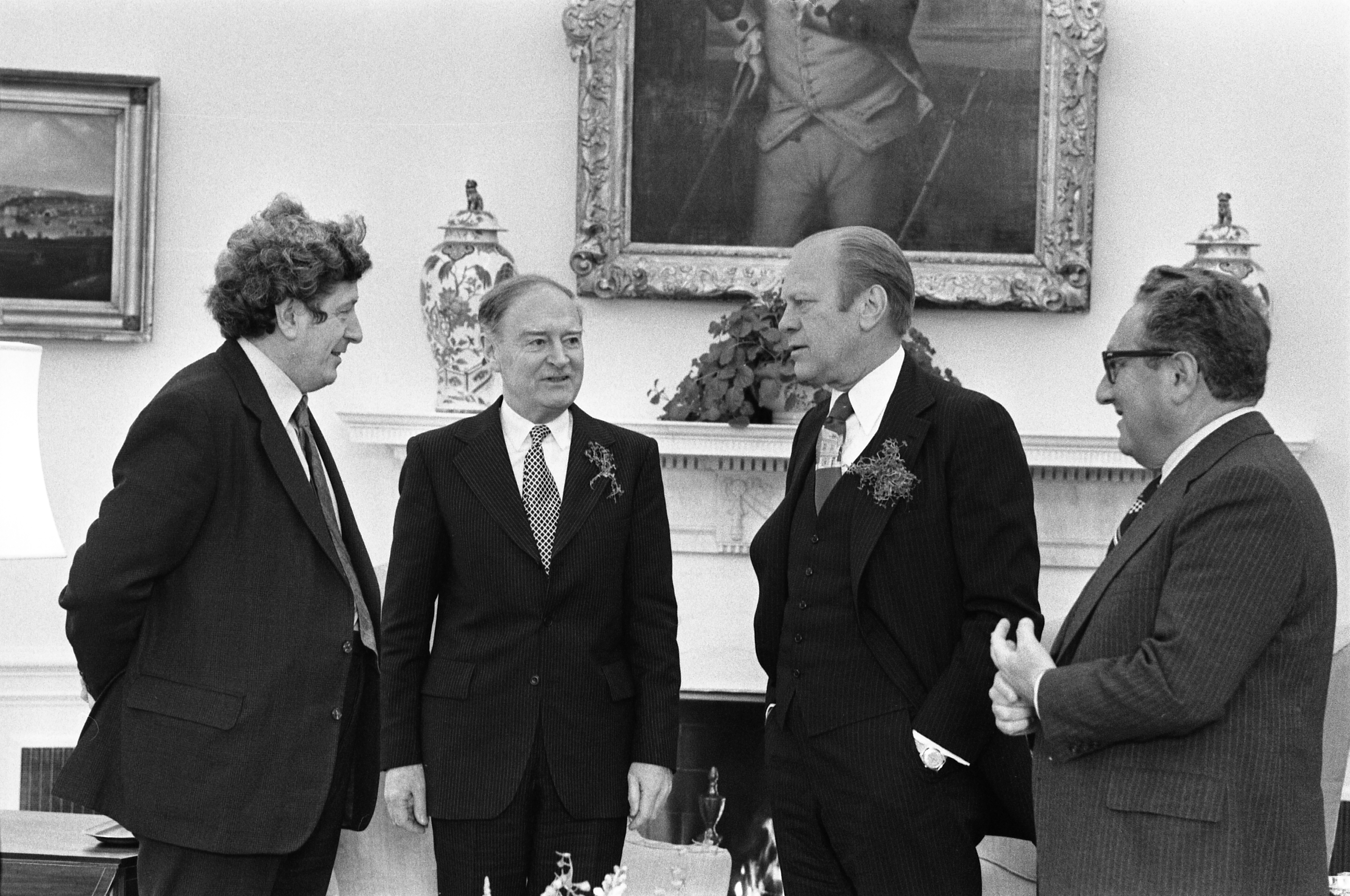
Gerald Ford and Prime Minister Liam Cosgrave of Ireland in front of the Swedish ivy in 1976. The plant was noted as bushier during the Ford years.

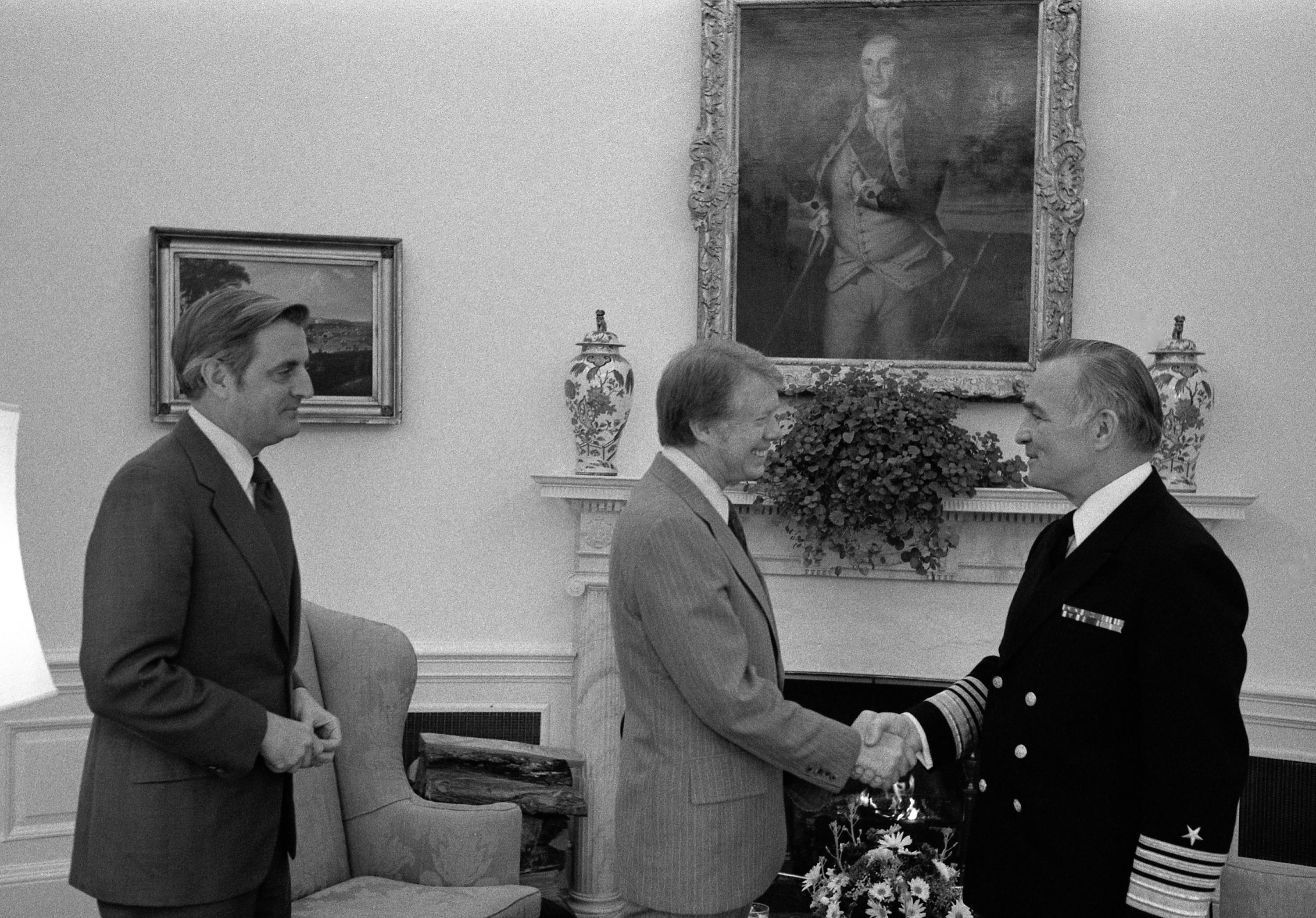
Jimmy Carter, Walter Mondale, and Stansfield Turner in front of the ivy in 1977.

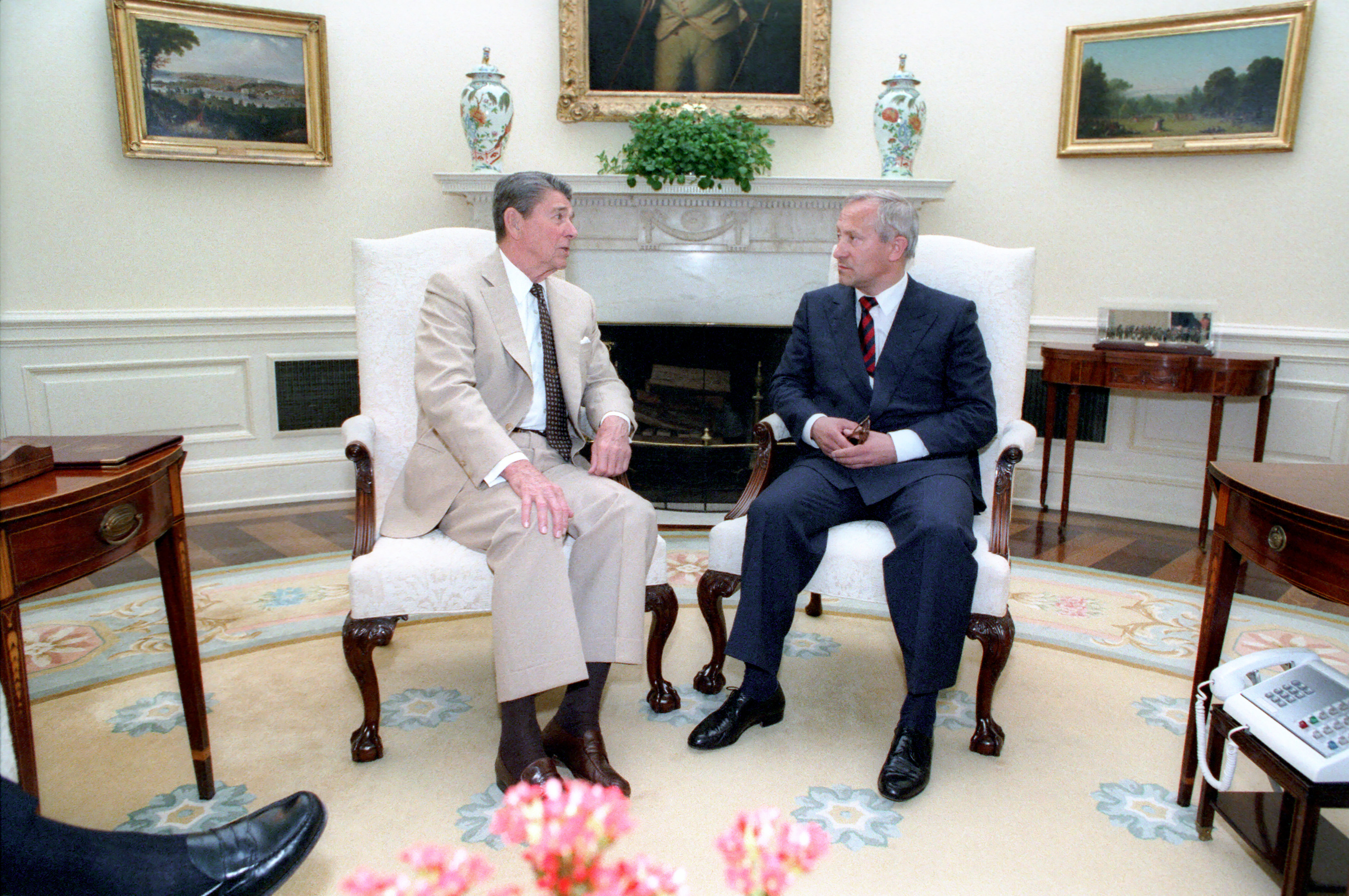
Ronald Reagan met with former KGB colonel and British spy Oleg Gordievsky in front of the ivy in 1987.

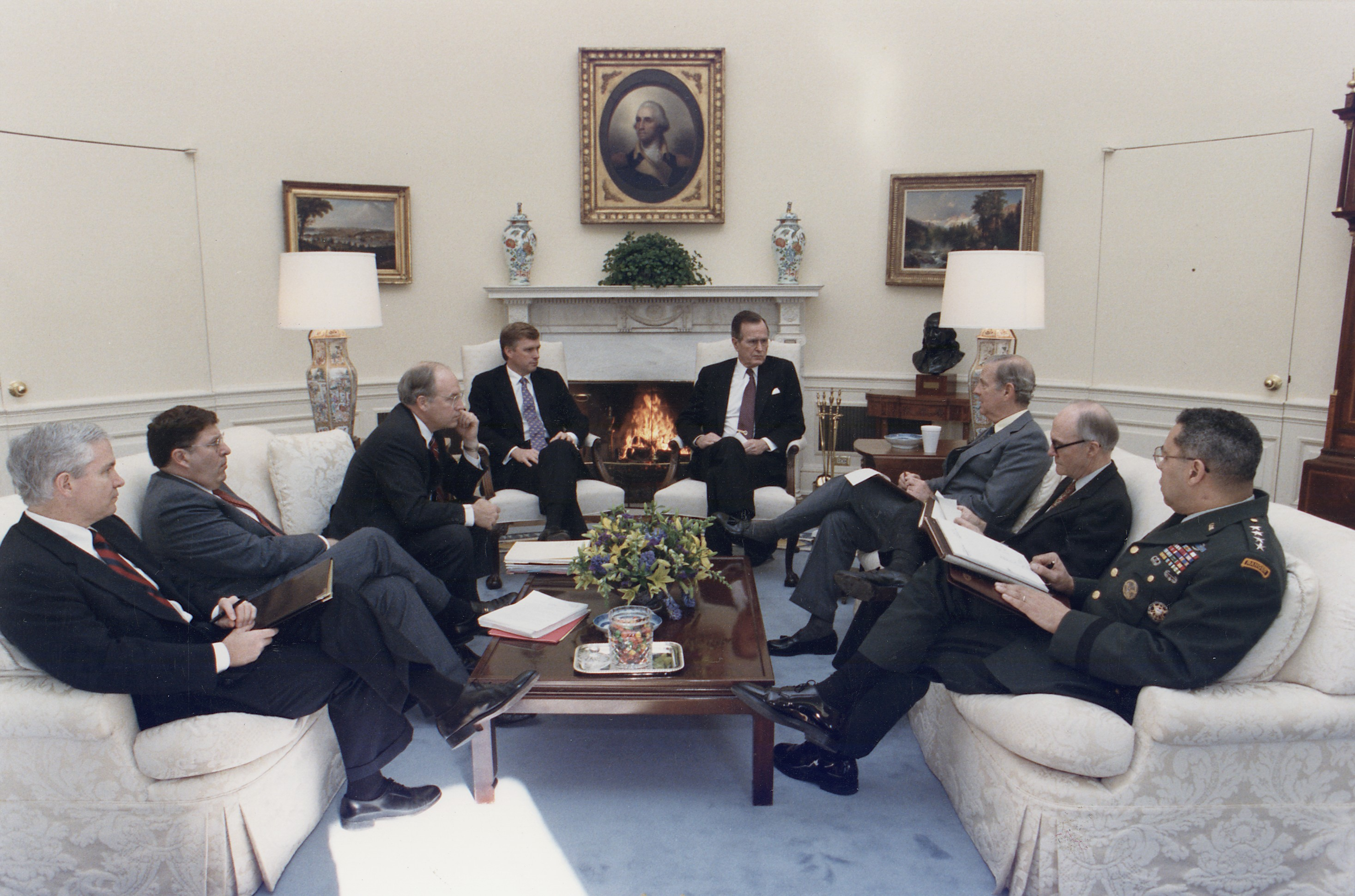
President George H. W. Bush and Vice President Dan Quayle hold a meeting beneath the ivy in 1991.

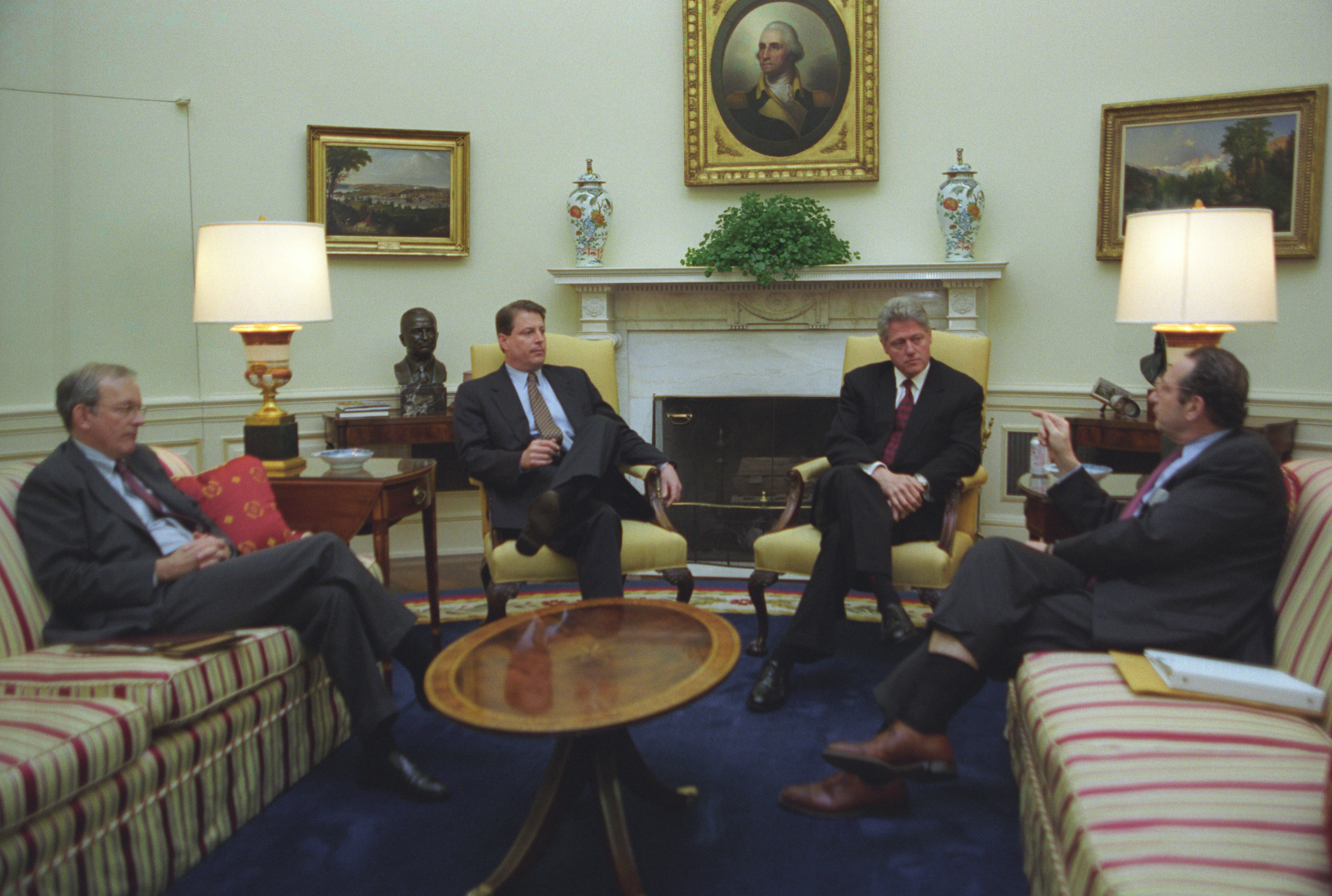
Bill Clinton and Al Gore in front of the ivy with CIA Director John Deutch and National Security Advisor Tony Lake in 1996.

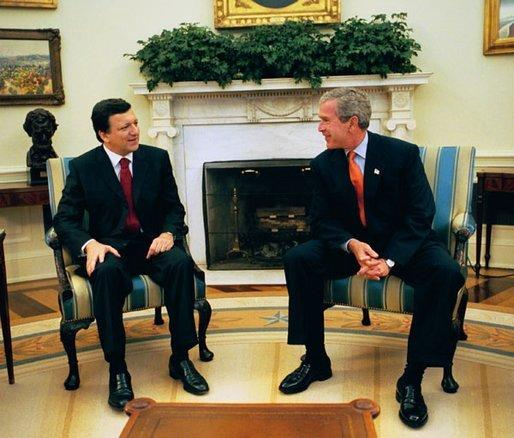
George W. Bush and Jose Manuel Durao Barroso in front of the ivy in 2003.

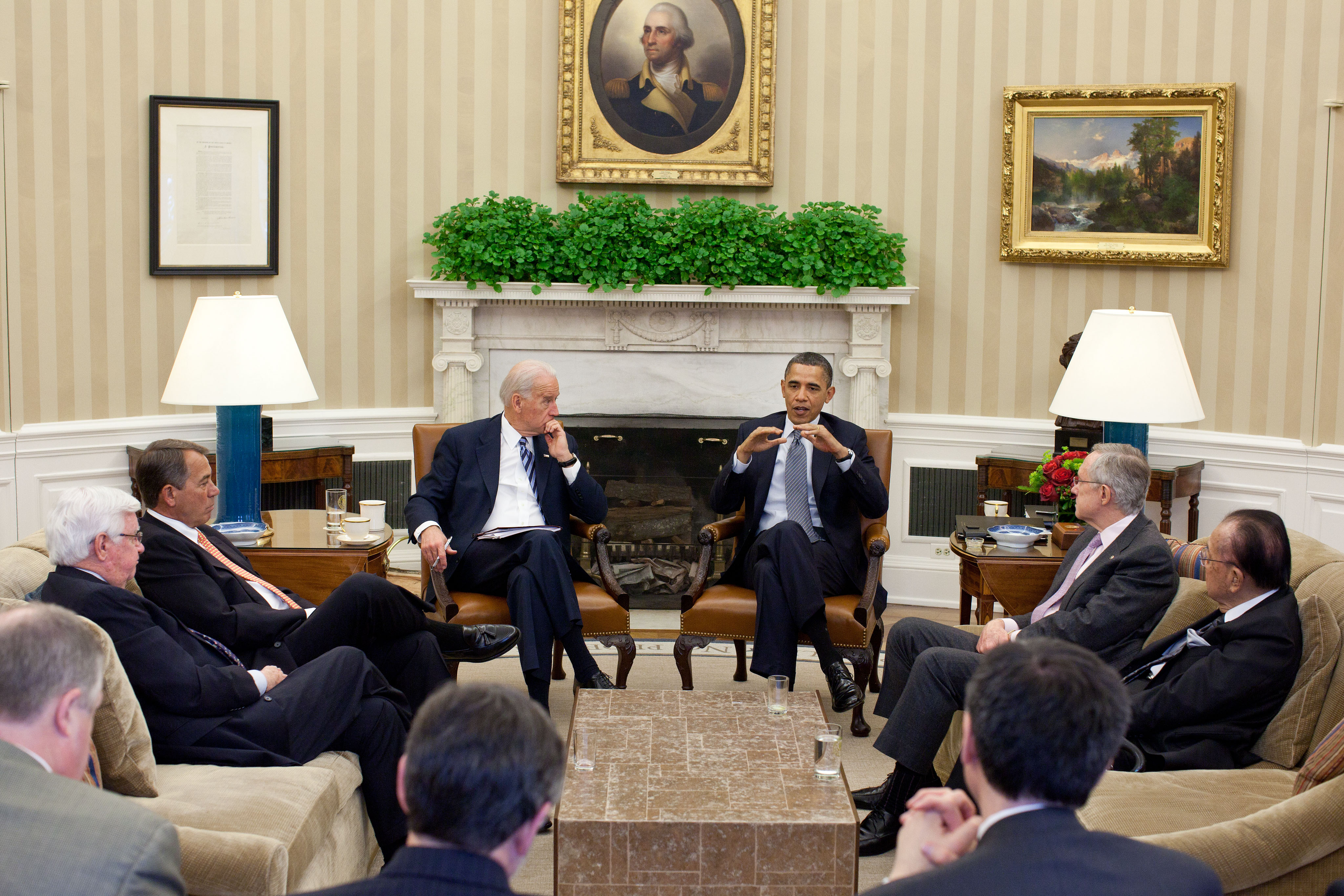
Joe Biden and Barack Obama hold a meeting beneath the ivy in 2011.

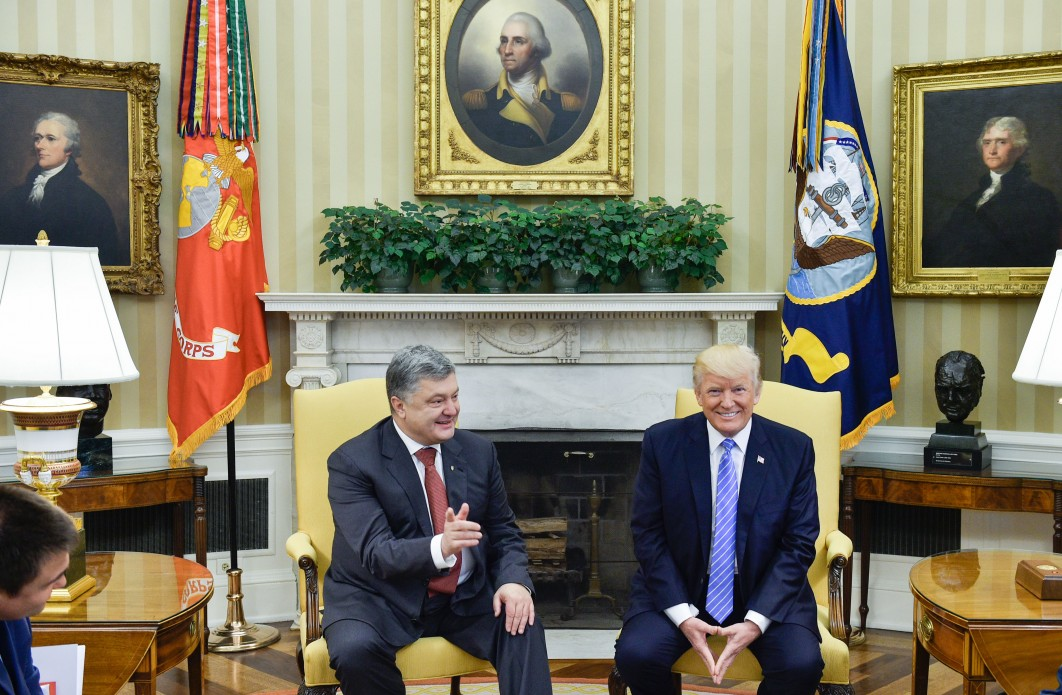
During Donald Trump's first term, the ivy was still used as decoration, as seen in this 2017 meeting between Trump and Petro Poroshenko.

President Joe Biden and Vice President Kamala Harris during a meeting in front of the ivy and the active fireplace on January 22, 2021

== Works cited ==
- Judkis, Maura (March 18, 2025). "The growing legend of the missing Oval Office ivy". Washington Post. Archived from the original on March 18, 2025.
- Andersen, Kurt (November 19, 1984). "Living: A Permanent Oval Office Occupant". Time.
- Beaty, Kevin (April 16, 2020). "Living: Houseplant of the week: The world's most powerful plant". denverite.com. Colorado Public Radio.
- Mencimer, Stephanie (March 8, 2025). "The Country's Most Famous Houseplant Is Missing. What Did Trump Do With It?". Mother Jones.
- Survant, Tyler (Fall 2020). "Modeling and Remodeling The Oval Office". Log (50): 195–202. JSTOR 27092886.
- Kirkpatrick, Jamie (July 12, 2022). "Heritage". The Talbot Spy.
- Sneeringer, Thomas (February 21, 2025). "From ivy league to bush league". The Washington Post.
- Bauer, Stephen; Leighton, Frances Spatz (1991). At Ease in the White House : The Uninhibited Memoirs of a Presidential Social Aide. Carol Publishing Group. ISBN 9781559720618.
