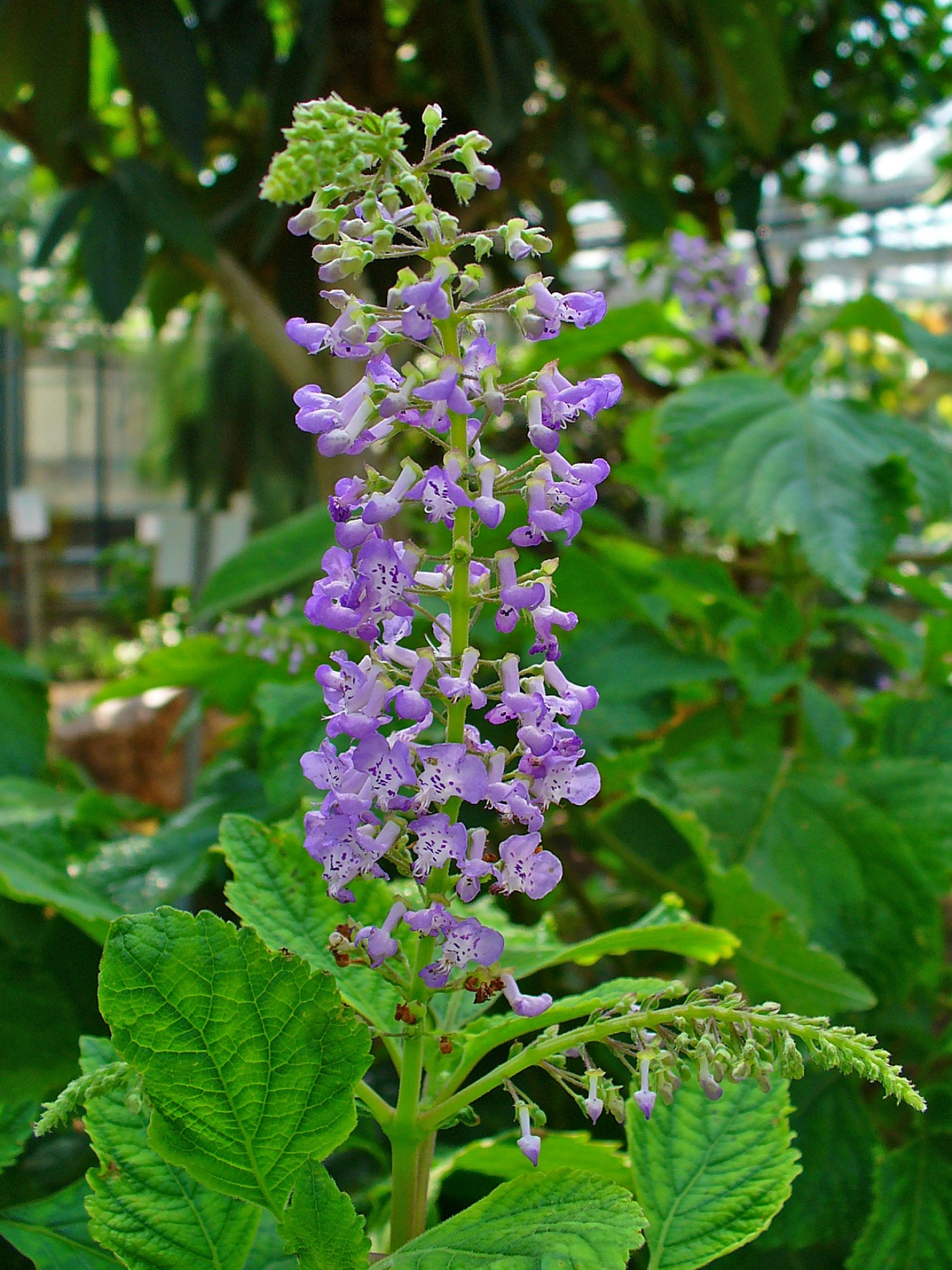

Scientific classification
- Kingdom: Plantae
- Clade: Tracheophytes
- Clade: Angiosperms
- Clade: Eudicots
- Clade: Asterids
- Order: Lamiales
- Family: Lamiaceae
- Genus: Plectranthus
- Species: P. fruticosus

Binomial name
- Plectranthus fruticosus L'Hér. (1788)

Synonyms
- Germinea urticifolia Lam.; Plectranthus arthropodus Briq.; Plectranthus behrii Compton; Plectranthus charianthus Briq.; Plectranthus galpinii Schltr.; Plectranthus peglerae T.Cooke; Plectranthus urticifolius (Lam.) Salisb.

= Plectranthus fruticosus =

Species of flowering plant

Plectranthus fruticosus, the forest spurflower, is a species of flowering plant in the mint family, Lamiaceae. It is native to Mozambique, Eswatini, and South Africa's KwaZulu-Natal, Northern, and Cape provinces. Growing up to 2 m (6.6 ft) tall, it is an erect evergreen shrub, with rounded, hairy leaves, and spikes of soft blue or mauve flowers in summer.

The Latin specific epithet fruticosus means "shrubby".

This plant is found throughout the Western Cape and Limpopo regions, enjoying the moist conditions and dappled shade of forest margins.

It has a long history of cultivation in Europe, where it requires protection from freezing temperatures. Several cultivars are available, of which the pink-flowered 'James' has won the Royal Horticultural Society's Award of Garden Merit.
