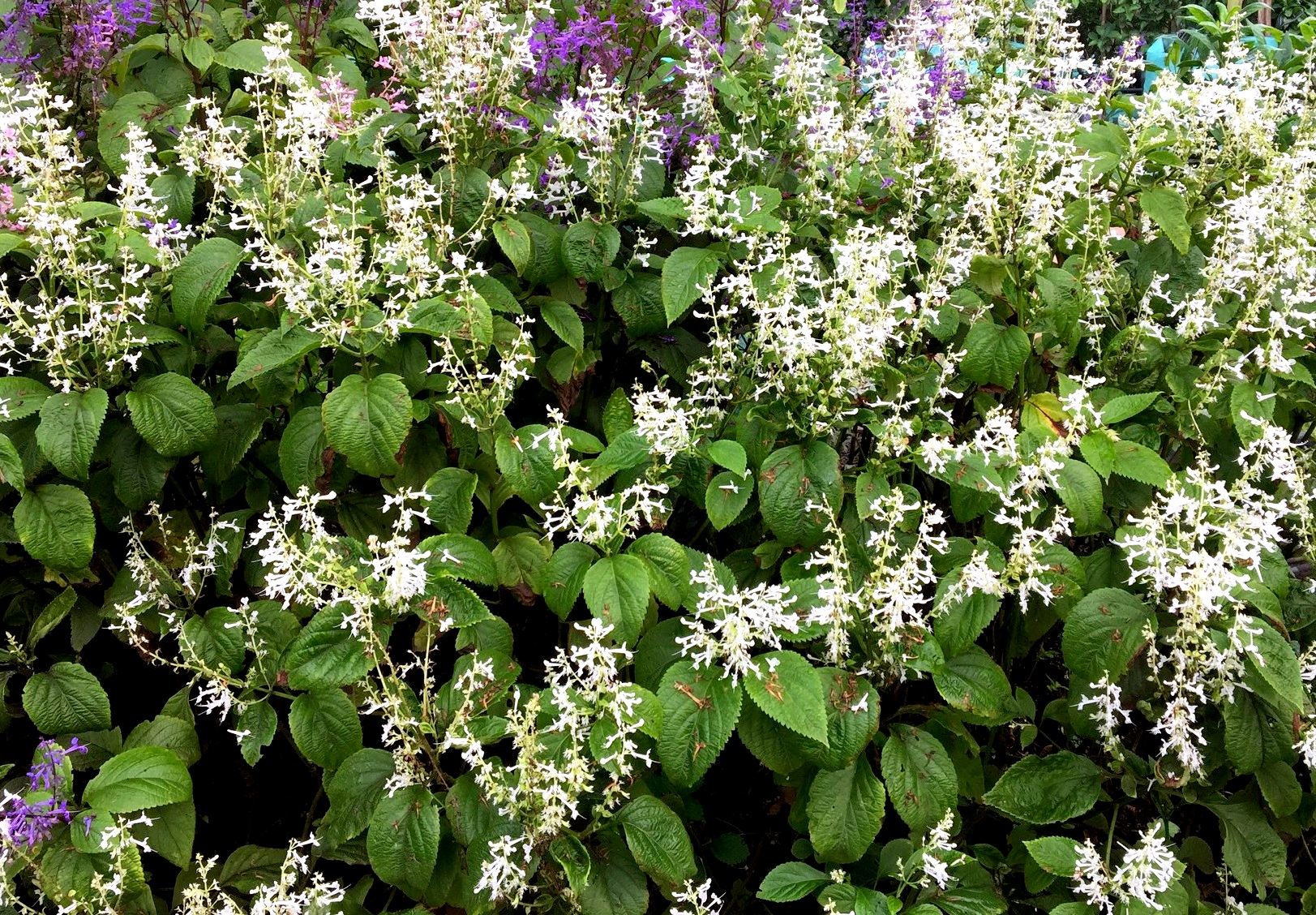
- Clump featuring both white and purple flowers

Scientific classification
- Kingdom: Plantae
- Clade: Tracheophytes
- Clade: Angiosperms
- Clade: Eudicots
- Clade: Asterids
- Order: Lamiales
- Family: Lamiaceae
- Genus: Plectranthus
- Species: P. ecklonii

Binomial name
- Plectranthus ecklonii Benth.

= Plectranthus ecklonii =

Species of shrub

Plectranthus ecklonii, commonly known as tall spurflower and Ecklon spurflower, is a shrub from the mint family Lamiaceae, native to South Africa. The habitat includes forest or shaded situations near the coast.

== Description ==
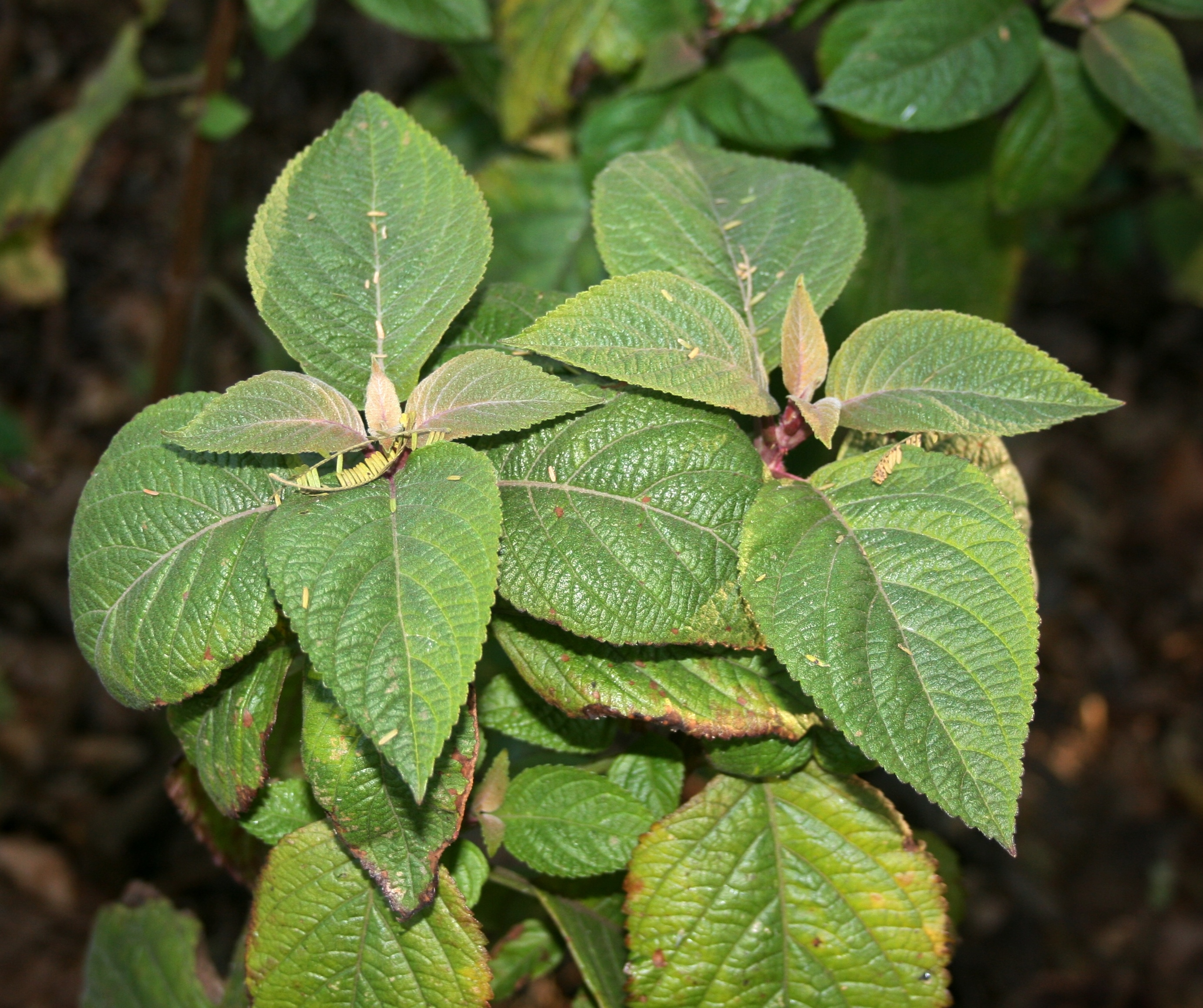
Foliage

Native to the Eastern Cape, KwaZulu-Natal and Mpumalanga provinces of South Africa, it is an aromatic, semi-succulent, fast-growing, erect shrub that reaches the heights of 3 metres (9.8 ft) and has ascending branches that are covered with short, multicellular hairs that are pointed upwards.

The ovate to elliptical, somewhat large leaves are 7.4 cm–19 cm x 3.5 cm–11.5cm in size, which are laid out in opposite pairs on the square-shaped stems and feature an edge-shaped base and acute apex, in addition to having clumps of purplish hairs on the nodes. The leaves give a nicotine-like smudge on the skin, if crushed or rubbed.

=== Inflorescence ===
The inflorescence consist of a terminal panicle that is 37 cm long. The double-lipped petals are 1.5-2.4 cm long, that range from bluish-purple, and at times pink or white. It produces flowers in autumn, from March (or as early as February) to May with a peak in April (in the southern hemisphere), although sporadic blooming can occur at any time of the year.

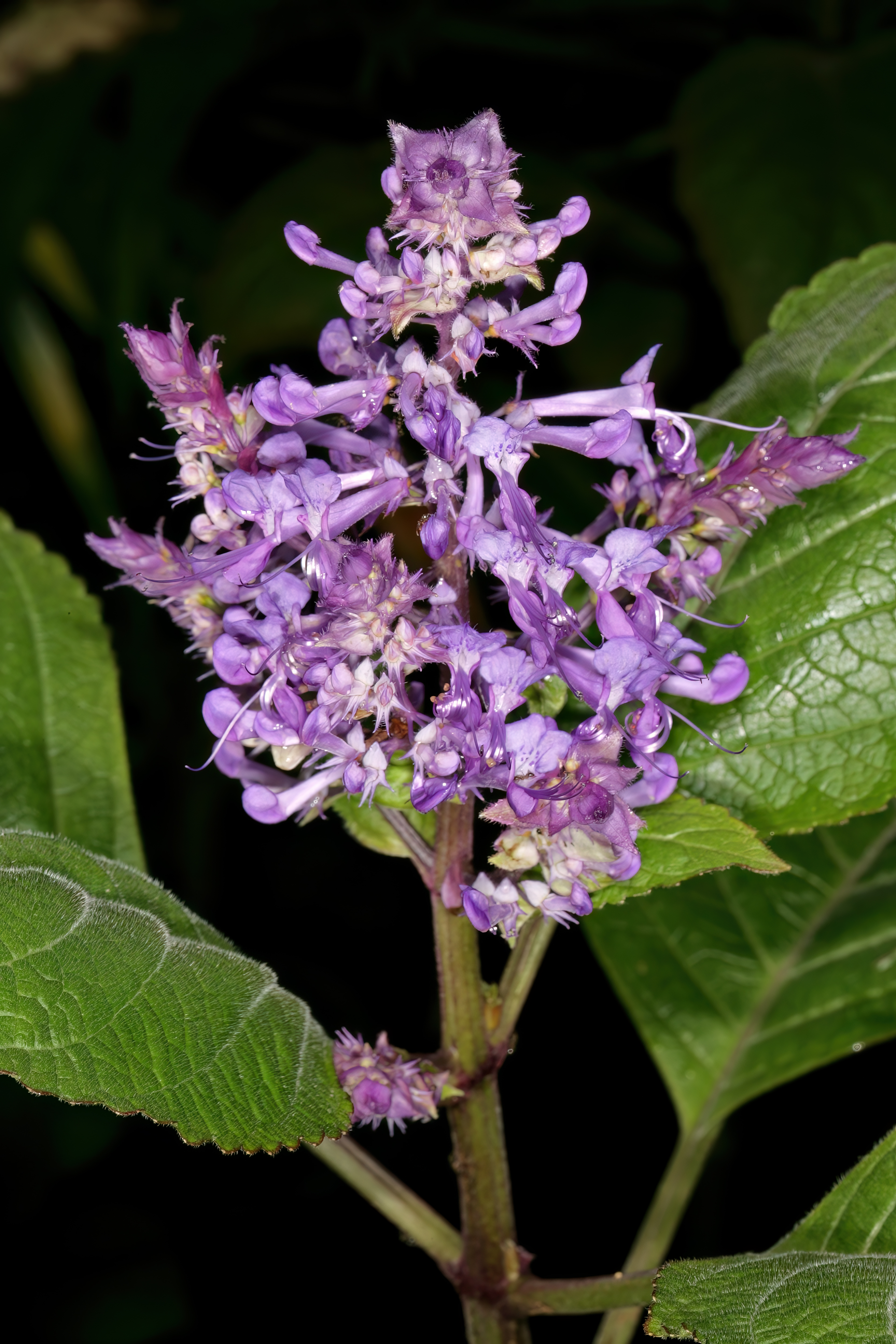
Purple flowers

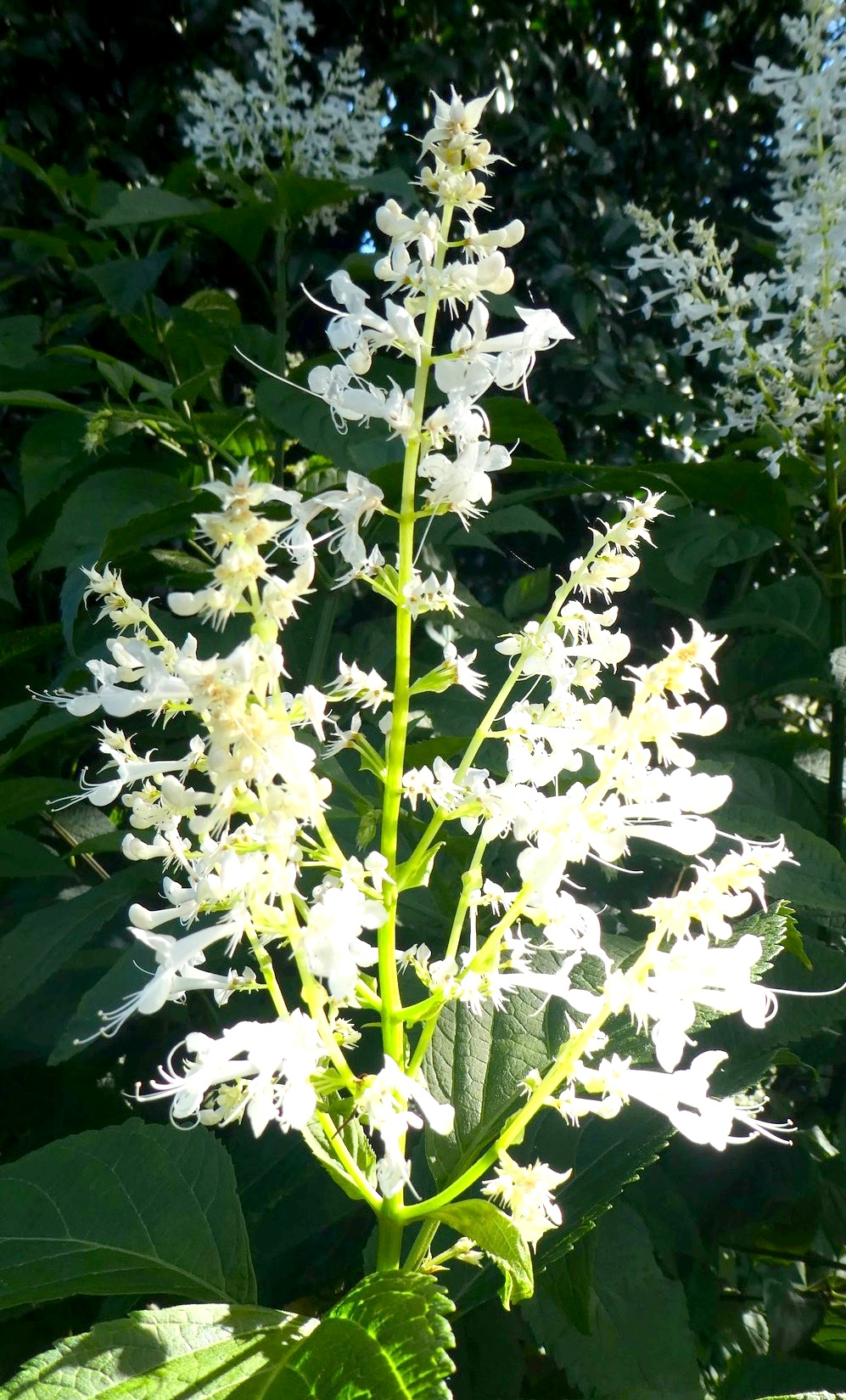
White flowers

=== Reproduction ===
Fruits are a small brown to black nutlet, that is 0.2 cm in length. The plant can reproduce by self-seeding and by broken stems which can root readily.

== Habitat ==
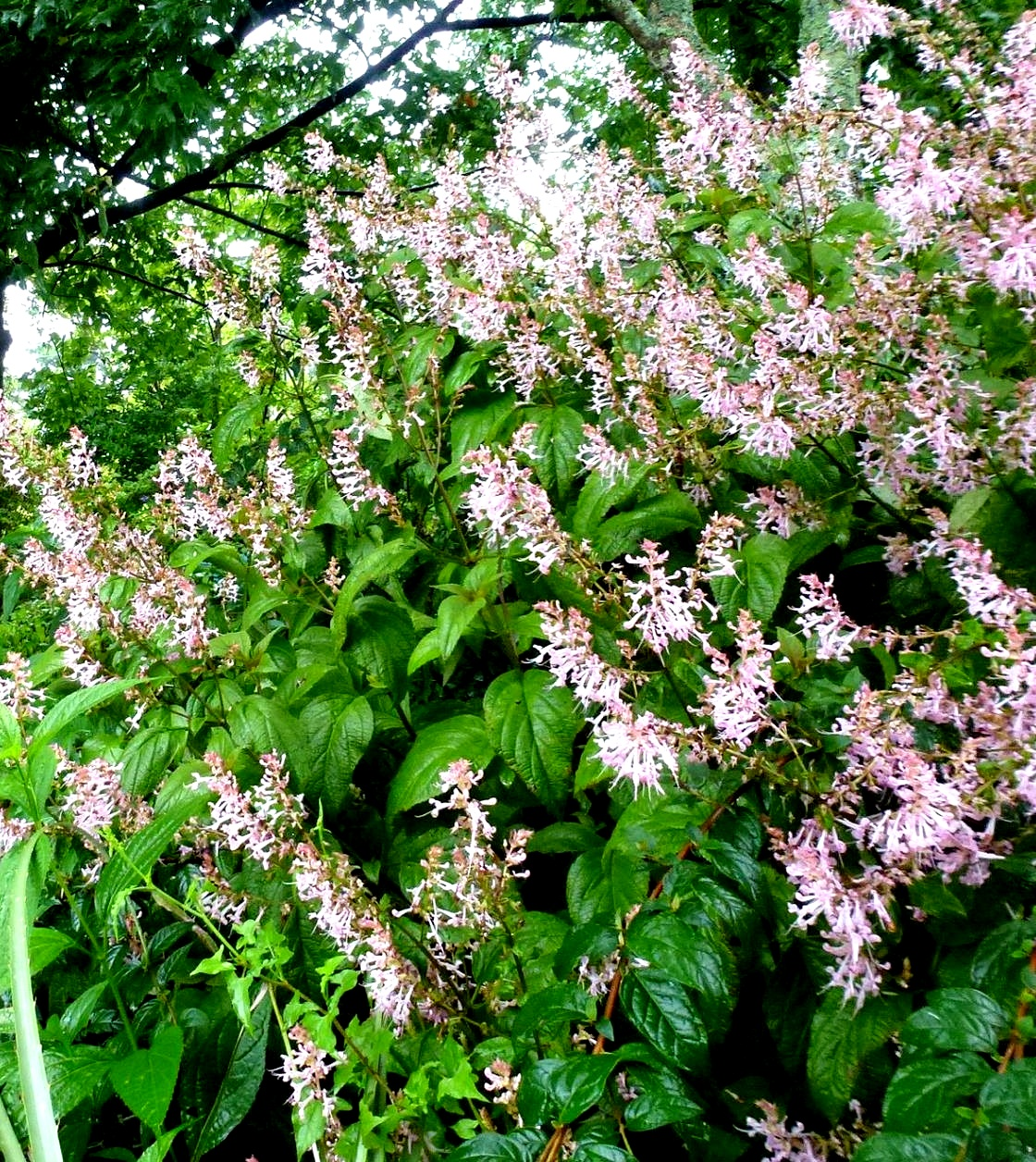
Growing beneath a tree as an understorey shrub

The plant is found in damp, coastal subtropical and temperate forest and margins of such forests in partly shaded areas. It is generally found in the understorey at forest margins or on wooded creek banks. It found in areas where the precipitation falls mainly during summer, with totals of 1, 000 to 1, 750 mm per annum.

Outside of its native range in South Africa, it has been recorded in the forest margins of the Blue Mountains in New South Wales, Victoria, and in New Zealand.

== Cultivation ==
The plant is used for its profuse display of flowers, which can bloom in the first year after planting, and also for its fast growth in the garden. It can tolerate mild frost, but not severe ones where it can die off. It is easily propagated by cuttings, as it can root readily in soil. It can thrive from mulching and the occasional fertilizer. It tends to look more attractive when it is replaced by new cuttings (since it gets straggly and woody after a few years). During severe drought, it can wilt, but will rejuvenate after rainfall.

Three cultivars of the plant exist:

- P. ecklonii 'Medley-Wood' – The common cultivar with blue flowers
- P. ecklonii 'Tommy' – Which features white flowers
- P. ecklonii 'Erma' – Pink flowered variety with the leaves and stems are specked with pink undertones
