= Plectranthus ambiguus =

Scientific classification
- Kingdom: Plantae
- Clade: Tracheophytes
- Clade: Angiosperms
- Clade: Eudicots
- Clade: Asterids
- Order: Lamiales
- Family: Lamiaceae
- Genus: Plectranthus
- Species: P. ambiguus

Binomial name
- Plectranthus ambiguus (Bolus) Codd

Synonyms
- Orthosiphon ambiguus Bolus; Plectranthus coloratus E.Mey.; Plectranthus dregei Codd

Species of flowering plant

Plectranthus ambiguus, the pincushion spurflower, is a species of flowering plant in the family Lamiaceae, native to the Eastern Cape and Kwazulu-Natal provinces of South Africa. Its cultivar 'Manguzuku' has gained the Royal Horticultural Society's Award of Garden Merit. Flowers are pinkish purple with faint purple lines on the upper edge.

== Ecology ==
Plectranthus ambiguus flowers from January to March. Among the Plectranthus species, Plectranthus ambiguus is considered a longer-tubed species with an average tube length of 28.1 mm. It is pollinated by a number of insects, such as species of Stenobasipteron (tangle-veined flies) and bees such as Allodape pernix.

When deprived of nitrogen, Plectranthus ambiguus begins losing leaves after two weeks, with all leaves shed in three to four weeks. When nitrogen is returned to the soil, new leaves emerge from the plant's axillary buds.

== Medicinal uses ==
Plectranthus ambiguus, known as iboza in Zulu, has been used by the Zulu people as a medicinal plant for a number of conditions, including skin sores, chest complaints, tonsillitis, fever, cough, and eye problems. Reports from the 1950s noted its use in treating respiratory ailments - the leaves are crushed and mixed with hot water to make a tonic for colds.
