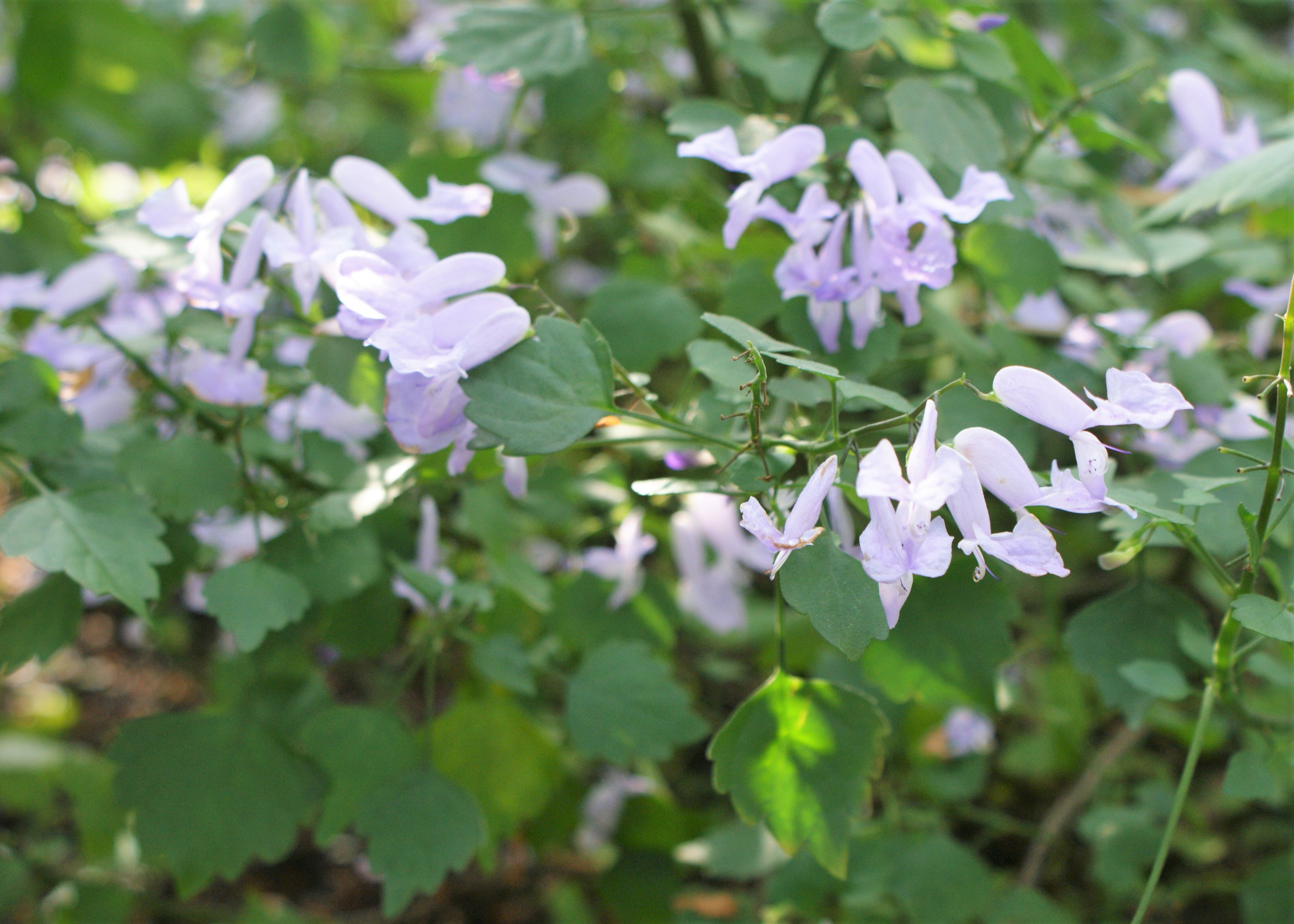

Scientific classification
- Kingdom: Plantae
- Clade: Tracheophytes
- Clade: Angiosperms
- Clade: Eudicots
- Clade: Asterids
- Order: Lamiales
- Family: Lamiaceae
- Genus: Plectranthus
- Species: P. saccatus

Binomial name
- Plectranthus saccatus Benth.

= Plectranthus saccatus =

Species of shrub

Plectranthus saccatus is a species of shrub from the mint family Lamiaceae, native to the southern Eastern Cape and KwaZulu-Natal provinces of South Africa. The habitat includes forest or shaded situations near the coast.

Three subdivisions are accepted.

- Plectranthus saccatus var. longitubus Codd
- Plectranthus saccatus subsp. pondoensis van Jaarsv. & T.J.Edwards
- Plectranthus saccatus subsp. saccatus
