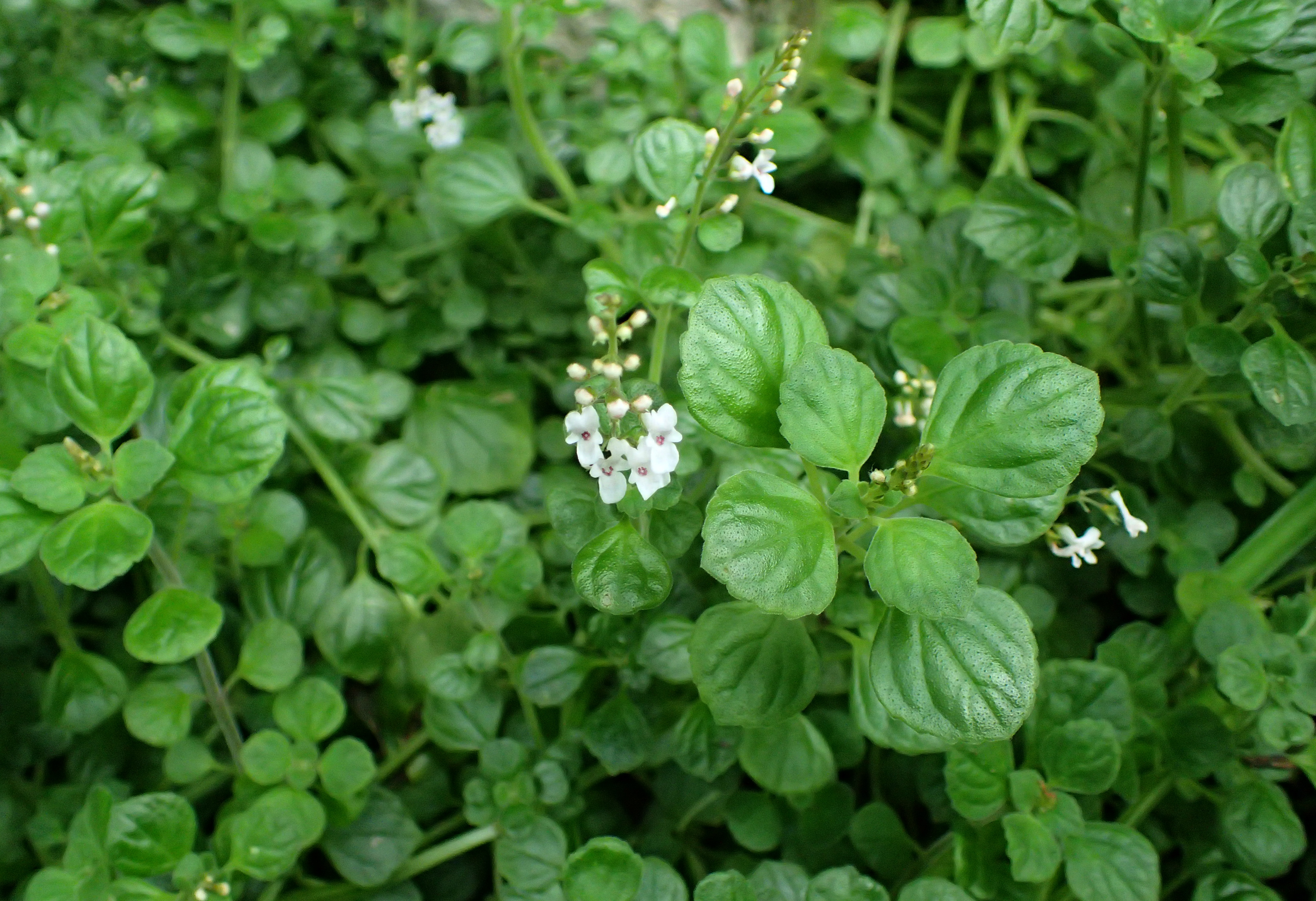

Scientific classification
- Kingdom: Plantae
- Clade: Tracheophytes
- Clade: Angiosperms
- Clade: Eudicots
- Clade: Asterids
- Order: Lamiales
- Family: Lamiaceae
- Genus: Plectranthus
- Species: P. strigosus

Binomial name
- Plectranthus strigosus Benth. ex E.Mey.

Synonyms
- Heterotypic Synonyms: Plectranthus kuntzeanus Domin; Plectranthus parviflorus Gürke

= Plectranthus strigosus =

Species of flowering plant

Plectranthus strigosus is a species of flowering plant in the mint family, Lamiaceae. This shrub is native to the Cape Provinces of South Africa. The habitat includes moist forest or gully situations.
