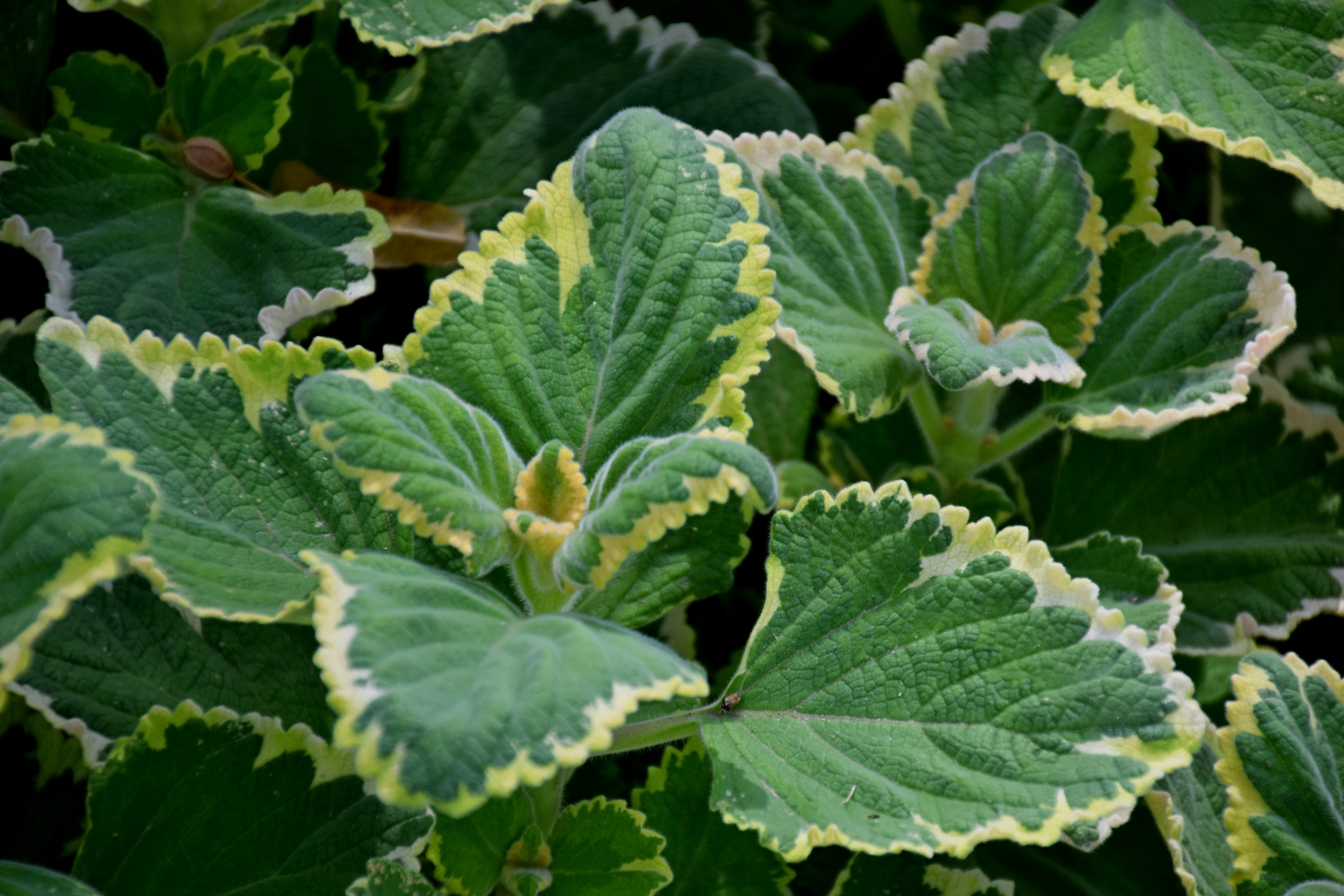
- Plectranthus ciliatus 'Sasha' cultivar
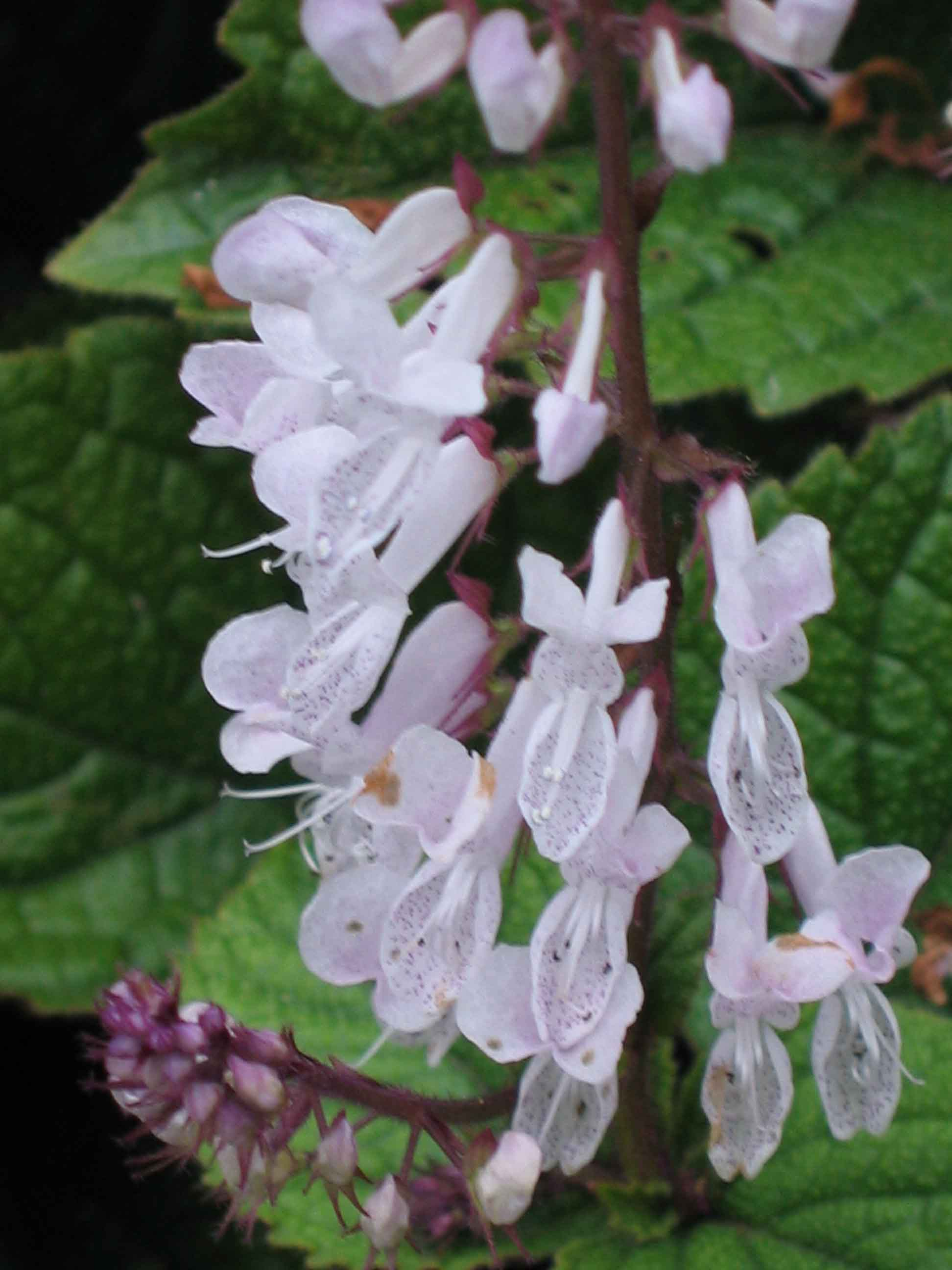
- Close-up of inflorescence

Scientific classification
- Kingdom: Plantae
- Clade: Embryophytes
- Clade: Tracheophytes
- Clade: Angiosperms
- Clade: Eudicots
- Clade: Asterids
- Order: Lamiales
- Family: Lamiaceae
- Genus: Plectranthus
- Species: P. ciliatus

Binomial name
- Plectranthus ciliatus E.Mey.

Synonyms
- Plectranthus natalensis Gürke

= Plectranthus ciliatus =

Species of flowering plant

Plectranthus ciliatus, called Indian borage, speckled spur flower, blue spur flower (a name shared with other members of its genus), and candlestick plant (shared with many other species), is a species of flowering plant in the family Lamiaceae. It is native to South Africa and Eswatini, and introduced to Victoria in Australia and the North and South Islands of New Zealand. With its Coleus‑like foliage, its cultivar 'Easy Gold' has gained the Royal Horticultural Society's Award of Garden Merit as an ornamental.
