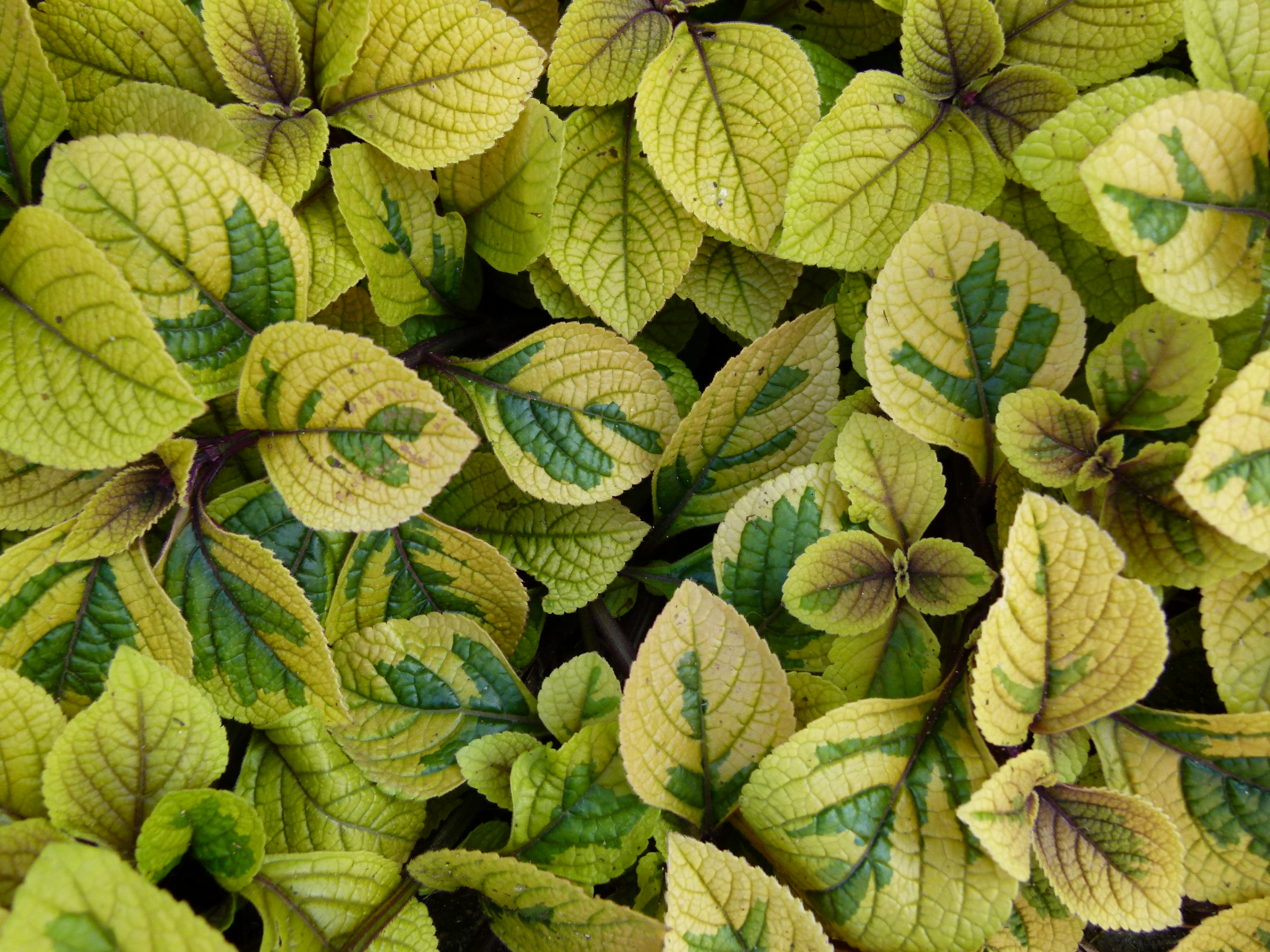
- The cultivar 'Lime Light'

Scientific classification
- Kingdom: Plantae
- Clade: Tracheophytes
- Clade: Angiosperms
- Clade: Eudicots
- Clade: Asterids
- Order: Lamiales
- Family: Lamiaceae
- Genus: Plectranthus
- Species: P. oertendahlii

Binomial name
- Plectranthus oertendahlii T.C.E.Fr.

= Plectranthus oertendahlii =

Species of flowering plant

Plectranthus oertendahlii is a species of flowering plant in the sage and mint family, Lamiaceae. Common names include silverleaf spurflower, Swedish ivy, Oertendahl's spurflower, November lights and Brazilian coleus, though it is native to eastern South Africa rather than Brazil. Plectranthus oertendahlii and the cultivar 'Uvongo' have gained the Royal Horticultural Society's Award of Garden Merit.

== Description ==
Growing to 20 cm (7.9 in) tall, it is a tender forest-dwelling perennial, with somewhat succulent heart-shaped leaves whose surface is strikingly marked with silver, while the undersides are a deep reddish purple. The undersides contain the chemical anthocyanin, which helps to trap what little light is available beneath the forest canopy. The stems are square, creeping and rooted. The leaves are slightly succulent, rounded to rhombic and roughly serrated. The top of the leaves is dark green with silver veins in silver, and the underside is deep red.

The pink-tinged white or pale blue flowers, held in erect sprays above the foliage, are double-lipped and resemble those of its relatives in the genus Salvia (sage). It blooms in autumn and winter.

== Cultivation ==
P. oertendahlii is named for Ivan Anders Oertendahl of Sweden's Uppsala University. Nobody knows how the plant reached Sweden, but it has been cultivated in Scandinavia for over a century, and remains popular there. It increases both by setting seed and by putting down roots as it spreads along the ground.

This plant and its cultivars are widely grown as ornamentals, often under its former name Coleus. In temperate climates it is grown as a houseplant, as it does not tolerate temperatures below 5 °C (41 °F). However, plants may be placed outside in a warm shaded area during the summer months.
