= Jaboticaba =

Jaboticaba or Jabuticaba can refer to

- the Brazilian municipality of Jaboticaba, Rio Grande do Sul
- any of several trees of the genera Plinia and Myrciaria, and their fruits:
  - Plinia cauliflora (known simply as jaboticaba, jabuticaba or Brazilian grapetree)
  - Myrciaria glazioviana (jabuticaba amarela or yellow jaboticaba)
  - Myrciaria tenella (jabuticaba macia or soft jaboticaba)
  - Plinia coronata (jabuticaba coroada or king jaboticaba)
  - Plinia grandifolia (jabuticaba graúda or large jaboticaba)
  - Plinia martinellii (jabuticabinha da mata or little forest jaboticaba)
  - Plinia oblongata (jabuticaba azeda or sour jaboticaba)
  - Plinia peruviana (jabuticaba cabinho or small stemmed jaboticaba)
  - Plinia phitrantha (jabuticaba branca or white jaboticaba)
  - Plinia rivularis (jabuticaba de cacho or bunched jaboticaba)
  - Plinia spirito-santensis (jabuticaba peluda de cruz, hairy cross jaboticaba)
