= Flora of Minas Gerais =

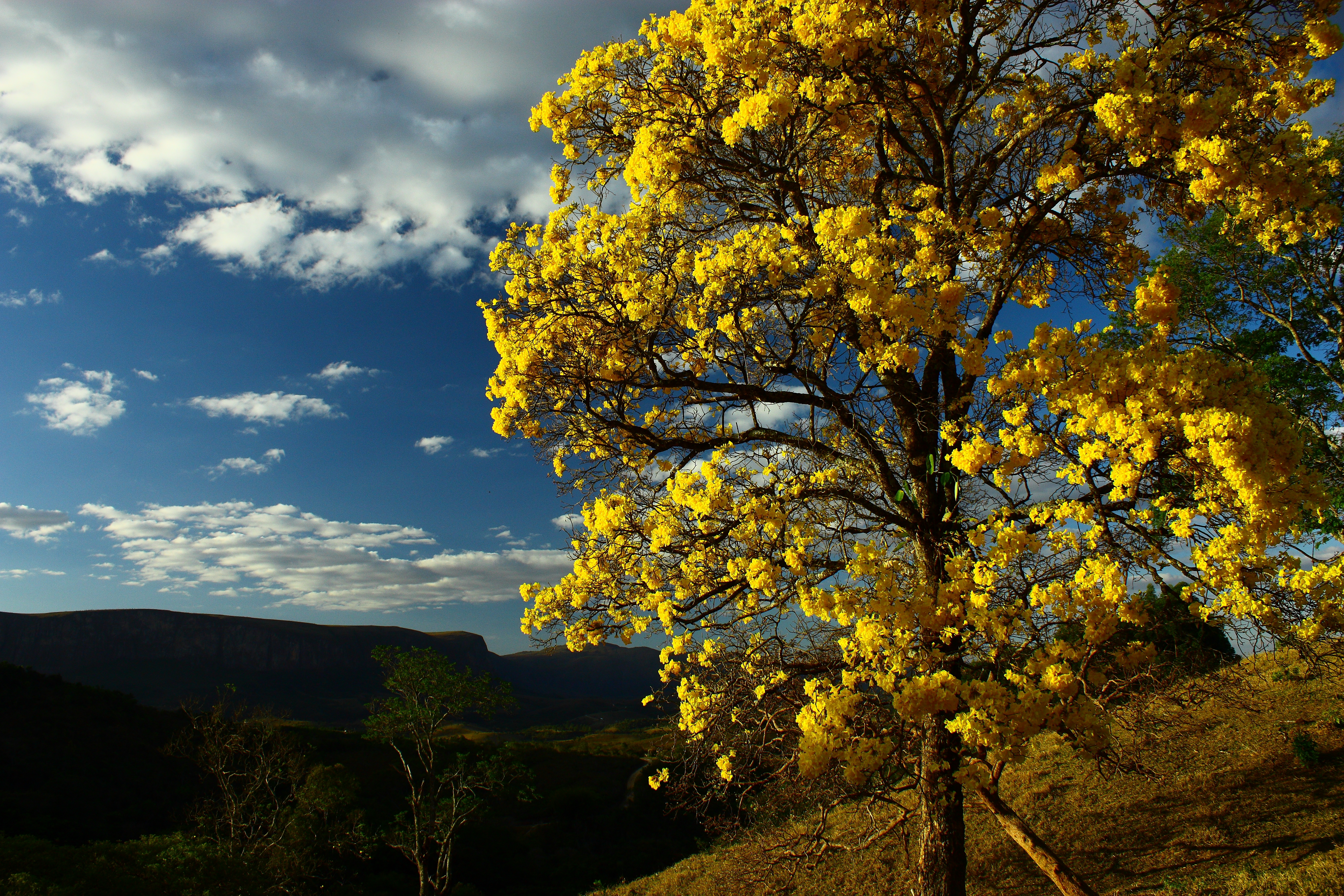
Handroanthus albus at Canastra Mountains, Minas Gerais.

Minas Gerais, Brazil's central state, larger domain is the tropical forest. Within it there are many types of plants. Separated by families this is a list of these plants:

== Poaceae ==
Bambusoideae - Imperata brasiliensis - Melinis minutiflora - Cymbopogon citratus.

== Arecaceae ==
Cocos nucifera - Attalea funifera - Acrocomia aculeata.

== Lauraceae ==
Ocotea megaphylla - Cinnamomum zeylanicum - Persea americana - Persea indica.

== Asteraceae ==
Vernonia polysphaera - Bellis annua - Pluchea sagittalis*.

== Fabaceae ==
Anadenanthera colubrina - Erythrina verna - Mimosa pudica - Dalbergia nigra - Ingá - Hymenaea courbaril - Enterolobium timbouva - Mora - Myrocarpus frondosus - Vigna unguiculata.

== Rubiaceae ==
Genipa americana - Calycophyllum spruceanum - Ruta graveolens - Cephaelis - Coffea arabica - Uncaria tomentosa*.

== Loranthaceae ==
Viscum cruciatum

== Lamiaceae ==
Rosmarinus officinalis - Ocimum basilicum.

== Solanaceae ==
Solanum lycocarpum - Solanum nigrum - Melissa officinalis - Datura suaveolens.

== Urticaceae ==
Cecropia.

== Cucurbitaceae ==
Momordica.

== Brassicaceae ==
Coronopus didymus.

== Moraceae ==
Ficus doliaria - Ficus gomelleira - Ficus clusiifolia.

== Bromeliaceae ==
Bromeliaceae pinguim - Ananas.

== Agavaceae ==
Furcraea foetida

== Myrtaceae ==
Eugenia uniflora - Psidium guajava- Psidium cattleianum - Plinia trunciflora - Campomanesia corymbosa.

== Rhamnaceae ==
Zizyphus joazeiro.

== Phytolaccaceae ==
Petiveria tetrandra

== Bignoniaceae ==
Tabebuia spp - Crescentia cujete - Tabebuia - Tabebuia aurea - Jacaranda mimosaefolia.

== Zingiberaceae ==
Amomum cardamom*

== Anacardiaceae ==
Schinopsis brasiliensis - Mangifera.

== Bixaceae ==
Bixa orellana.

== Euphorbiaceae ==
Euphorbia pulcherrima - Alchornea triplinervia - Ricinus communis - Joanesia princeps.

== Rutaceae ==
Balfourodendron riedelianum - Pilocarpus microphyllus - Citrus × limon - Citrus reticulata - Citrus x sinensis.

== Sapindaceae ==
Sapindus saponaria.

== Apocynaceae ==
Plumeria.

== Malvaceae ==
Luehea.

== Meliaceae ==
Carapa

== Annonaceae ==
Duguetia lanceolata - Annona coriacea.

== Tropaeolaceae ==
Tropaeolum majus

== Apiaceae ==
Foeniculum vulgare - Coriandrum sativum.

== Salicaceae ==
Casearia sylvestris - Casearia gossypiosperma*.

== Phyllanthaceae ==
Phyllanthus acutifolius.

== Musaceae ==
Musa.

== Araceae ==
Xanthosoma sagittifolium - Philodendron.

== Rosaceae ==
Rosa

== Caricaceae ==
Carica papaya

== Lecythidaceae ==
Sapucaia

== Myristicaceae ==
Bicuiba

== Others ==
- Polypodium lepidopteris

Portuguese common names

- Catita
- Gema de Ovo
- Fruta da Cutia
- Gonçalves
- João Henrique (plant)
- Limpa Viola
- Jurobão
- Pasto de Abelha
- Gondó

== See also ==
- Flora of Minas Gerais
- List of plants of Atlantic Forest vegetation of Brazil
- Flora of the Atlantic Forest
