= P. edulis =

P. edulis may refer to:

- Passiflora edulis, a plant species cultivated commercially in frost-free areas for its fruit
- Phyllostachys edulis, a bamboo species
- Pinus edulis, a pine species
- Plectranthus edulis, an annual plant species
- Plinia edulis, the cambucá, a tree species found in Brazil
- Pueraria edulis, a plant species belonging to the genus Pueraria
- Pyxicephalus edulis, the edible bullfrog, a frog species

== Synonyms ==
- Paeonia edulis, a synonym for Paeonia lactiflora, the Chinese peony or common garden peony, a herbaceous perennial flowering plant species native to central and eastern Asia from eastern Tibet across northern China to eastern Siberia

== See also ==
- Edulis (disambiguation)
