= S. edule =

S. edule may refer to:

- Saccharum edule, a plant species belonging of the genus Saccharum, the sugarcane
- Sechium edule, an edible plant species

== Synonyms ==
- Solanum edule, a synonym for Solanum sisymbriifolium, a plant species
- Stylophyllum edule, a synonym for Dudleya edulis, a plant species

== See also ==
- Edule (disambiguation)
