= Gameleira (Carira) =

Village in Brazil

- Village
- Location of Carira in Sergipe

- Location within Brazil
- Coordinates: 10°24′57″S 37°40′50″W
- Country: Brazil
- State: Sergipe
- Municipality: Carira
- Elevation: 296 m (971 ft)

Gameleira (Brazilian Portuguese pronunciation: [ɡɐ̃meˈleɾɐ]) is a village in the municipality of Carira, state of Sergipe, in northeastern Brazil. It is named after the Portuguese word for the Ficus gomelleira tree.

== See also ==
- List of villages in Sergipe
