= C. edulis =

C. edulis may refer to:

- Canna edulis, the eatable species of the Canna genus
- Caralluma edulis, a succulent plant species
- Carissa edulis, the conkerberry or bush plum, a shrub species
- Carpobrotus edulis, a creeping, mat-forming succulent plant species
- Casimiroa edulis, the white sapote, custard apple and cochitzapotl in Nahuatl, a plant species
- Catha edulis, the khat, a flowering plant species
- Commiphora edulis, (Klotzsch) Engl., a plant species in the genus Commiphora
- Cordeauxia edulis, also known as the ye'eb, yeheb or jeheb nut, a tree species
- Coula edulis, a tree species native to tropical western Africa from Sierra Leone to Angola

== See also ==
- Edulis (disambiguation)
