= C. edule =

C. edule may refer to:

- Cerastoderma edule, the common cockle, an edible saltwater clam species
- Cirsium edule, the edible thistle, a thistle species

== See also ==
- Edule (disambiguation)
