= M. edule =

M. edule may refer to:

- Memecylon edule, a small evergreen tree native to India
- Mesembryanthemum edule, a synonym for Carpobrotus edulis, the ice plant, highway ice plant, pigface or Hottentot fig, a plant species native to South Africa

== See also ==
- Edule (disambiguation)
