= Iglesia de Santa Lucía, Comayagua =

Classical mechanics

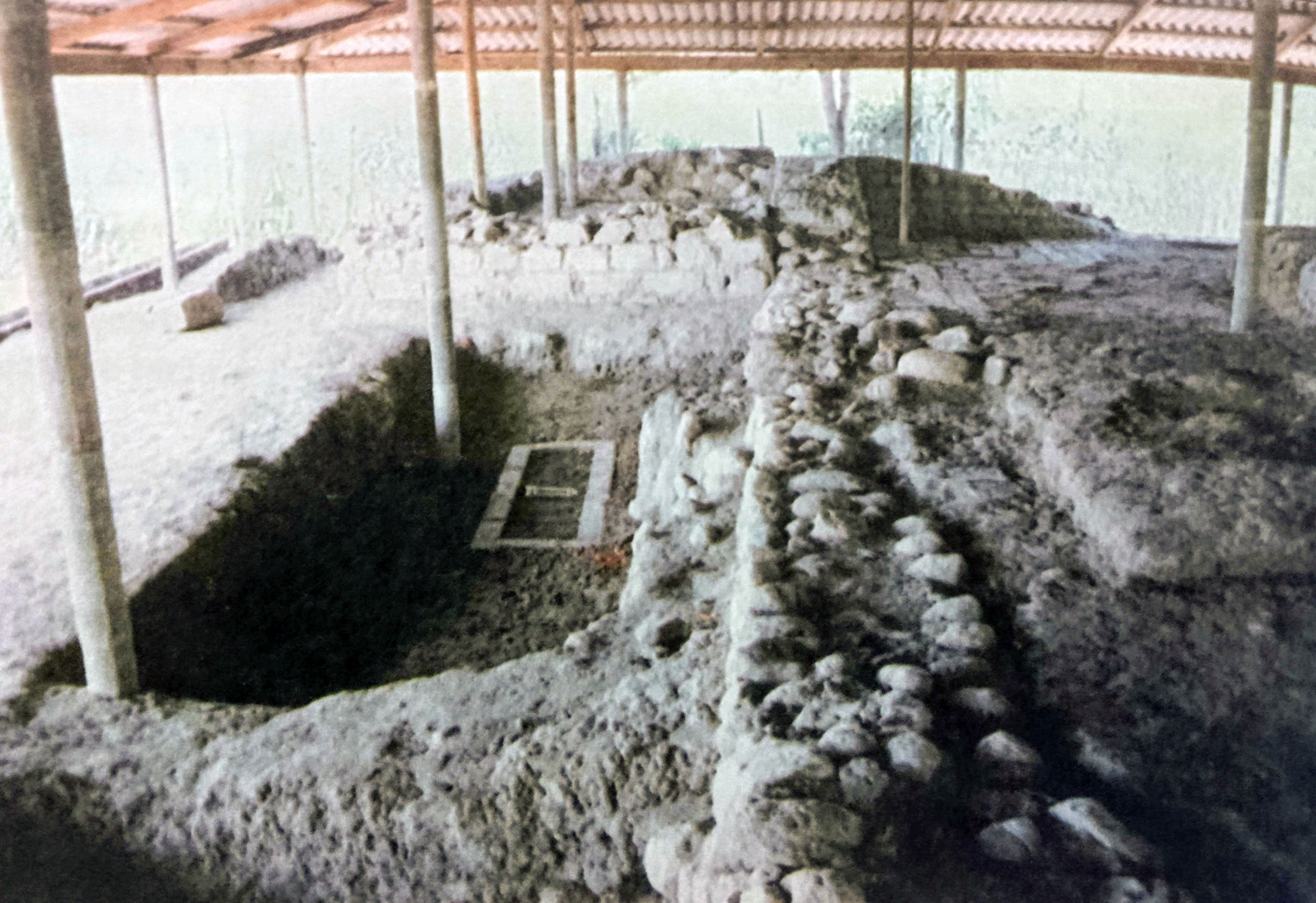
View to the presbitery.

The Church of Santa Lucia or also called Ruinas de la Iglesia de Santa Lucía de Jeto is a colonial archaeological site in the city of Comayagua, Honduras, showing the remains of what was once one of the first Catholic churches of the 16th century which was destroyed and abandoned after an earthquake at the beginning of the century.

== History ==
The ruins shows the remnants of a structure constructed between 1558 and 1560, primarily for the evangelization of the indigenous population in the region by Catholic orders. The church was built in the settlement of Jeto, a name derived from the abundant presence of the Jabuticaba tree (known locally as the "black olive tree"). This settlement, largely inhabited by indigenous communities, was located just two kilometers from the city of Comayagua, by the time was just founded just some few decades ago. The church was part of a broader missionary effort led by the Mercedarian order during the Viceroyalty of New Spain, aimed at the religious and cultural conversion of the local populations.

Initially, the church was a little and modest structure, consisting only of wooden pillars and a thatched roof, without any permanent walls. Over time, the church was expanded with the addition of masonry walls and a bell tower. This form of the church would remain until October 14, 1774, when a devastating earthquake caused significant damage to the building. Despite this, reconstruction efforts began in 1784 under the direction of the parish priest, Father Manuel Sabastía de Tovas. During this phase, walls were rebuilt, and the roof was restored.

However, in 1809, another earthquake struck, ultimately leading to the complete collapse of the church. By this time, the settlement of Jeto had already largely disappeared, with its population having either relocated to nearby communities or to the provincial capital. The church, once a central part of the settlement, was left in ruins and largely abandoned, with little salvageable material left from its previous structure.

== Rediscovering ==
The ruins of the old Church of Santa Lucía in Honduras remained completely abandoned for over a century, hidden under layers of neglect, until their rediscovery in 1975. The discovery occurred when local residents, while extracting material from a mound to make adobe bricks, uncovered human remains, sparking significant interest within the community. This accidental find soon caught the attention of local authorities, and the mayor of Comayagua authorized a series of excavations to explore the site.

During the initial excavations, the ruins of what was identified as an old church, likely dating from the colonial period, were revealed. To protect the site, a protective dome was constructed over the excavated area, and a storage shed was established to house the tools and objects found during the excavation. However, the initial enthusiasm for excavating and preserving the ruins did not last long.

Despite the early efforts, the Church of Santa Lucía fell back into neglect, slipping into obscurity once again. The area became a dumping ground, and the site was subjected to looting. The ruins, already showing signs of wear, were left unprotected and exposed to further deterioration and vandalism.

It wasn't until the late 2010s that interest in the site was rekindled, and plans for its restoration began to take shape. It was in 2019 that concrete actions were taken to rehabilitate the site, focusing on the partial restoration of the church's structure. Today, the site is under the care of the Honduran Institute of Anthropology and History (IHAH), which is responsible for its preservation and management, aiming to protect the historical heritage and promote further research into this important colonial-era ruin.

The rediscovery and subsequent restoration of the ruins of the Church of Santa Lucía represents an effort to recover an important piece of Honduras’ history and ensure that this cultural heritage is not lost again. The site, now once again being protected and studied, remains a testament to the historical richness of the region and an opportunity for both research and cultural tourism in the country. This church and its subsequent ruin reflect both the religious and socio-cultural dynamics of the Spanish colonial era in Honduras, as well as the natural forces that shaped the region's architectural heritage.

== See also ==
- History of Honduras
