= E. edulis =

E. edulis may refer to:

- Echeveria edulis, a synonym of Dudleya edulis, the fingertips, a succulent plant species
- Euterpe edulis, the juçara, açaí-do-sul or palmiteiro, a palm tree species

== See also ==
- Edulis (disambiguation)
