= Cabinho =

Cabinho may refer to

- Plinia peruviana, a species of plant in the family Plinia.
- Evanivaldo Castro, (born April 28, 1948 in Salvador de Bahia), a Brazilian former professional footballer.
