= Plinia salticola =

Conservation status
- Least Concern (IUCN 3.1)

Scientific classification
- Kingdom: Plantae
- Clade: Tracheophytes
- Clade: Angiosperms
- Clade: Eudicots
- Clade: Rosids
- Order: Myrtales
- Family: Myrtaceae
- Genus: Plinia
- Species: P. salticola

Binomial name
- Plinia salticola McVaugh

Species of plant in the myrtle family

Plinia salticola, commonly known as dwarf mulchi or dwarf cambucá, is a species of flowering plant in the family Myrtaceae. It is a tree native to Costa Rica and Panama, where it grows in lowland and montane tropical moist forest. It grows to between 1 and 1.5 metres (3 ft 3 in and 4 ft 11 in) tall, and produces edible orange fruits.

The species was described by Rogers McVaugh in 1963.
