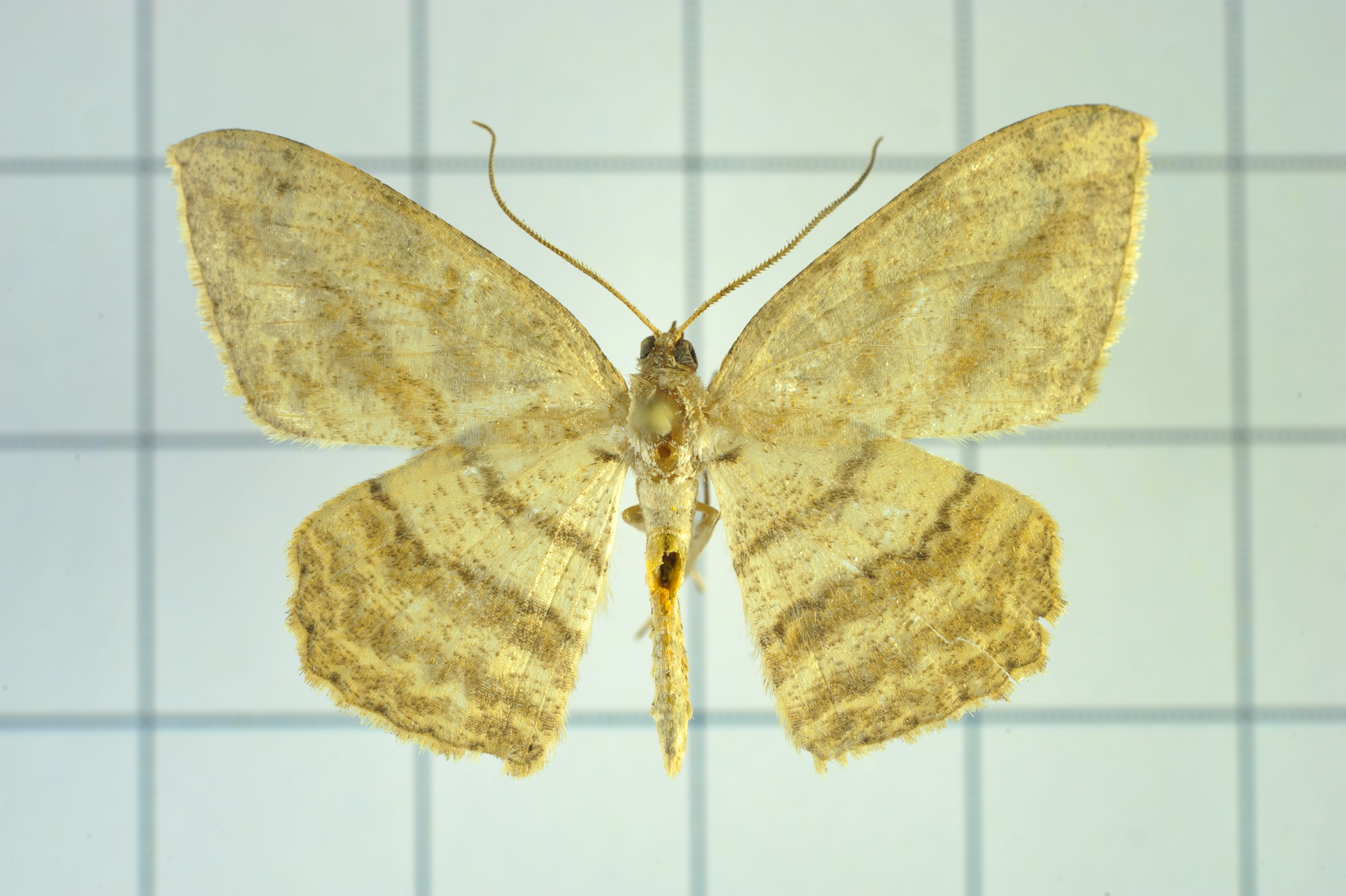

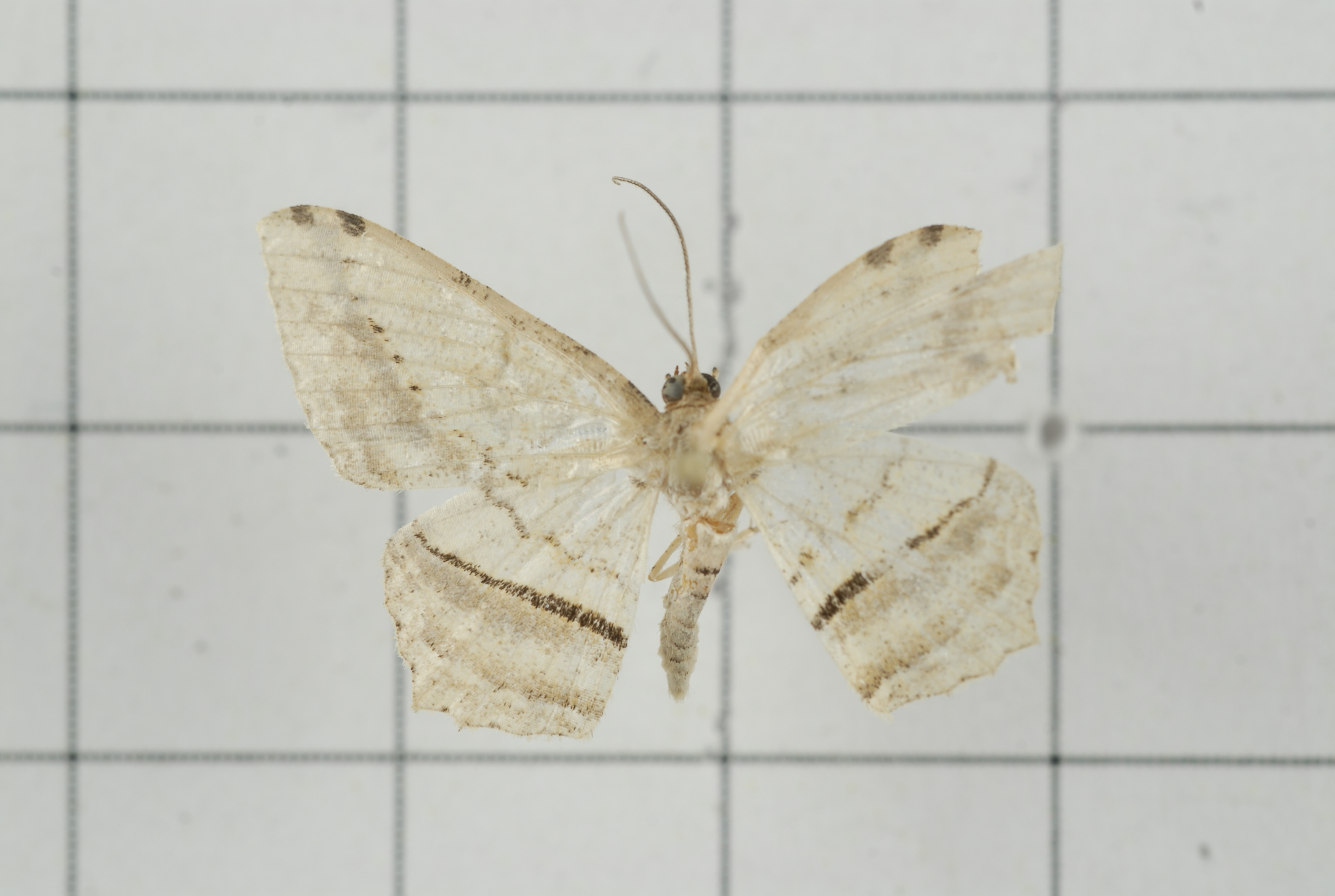

Scientific classification
- Kingdom: Animalia
- Phylum: Arthropoda
- Clade: Pancrustacea
- Class: Insecta
- Order: Lepidoptera
- Family: Geometridae
- Genus: Calletaera
- Species: C. postvittata

Binomial name
- Calletaera postvittata (Walker, 1861)

Synonyms
- Luxiaria postvittata Walker, 1861; Acidalia postvittata Walker, 1861; Macaria honoraria Walker, 1861; Macaria permotaria Walker, 1861

= Calletaera postvittata =

Species of moth

Calletaera postvittata is a moth of the family Geometridae first described by Francis Walker in 1861. It is found in the Indian sub-region, Sri Lanka, Taiwan, and Sundaland.

Its ground color is pale brown. Hindwing postmedial is distinctly dark brown and broadening gradually towards the dorsum. The caterpillar has a pale grass-greenish body with broken whitish lines bordered with pinkish-brown bands. Head dirty yellow white in color with pinkish-brown spots. Pupation occurs in a light cocoon made by particles of substrate in a crevice or on the ground. Host plants of the caterpillar are Memecylon edule and other Memecylon species.
