= Kaayam =

Kaayam may refer to:

- Asafoetida, the Malayalam name for a species of Ferula native to Persia
- Memecylon edule, a small evergreen tree native to India
