= Plinia inflata =

Scientific classification
- Kingdom: Plantae
- Clade: Embryophytes
- Clade: Tracheophytes
- Clade: Spermatophytes
- Clade: Angiosperms
- Clade: Eudicots
- Clade: Rosids
- Order: Myrtales
- Family: Myrtaceae
- Genus: Plinia
- Species: P. inflata

Binomial name
- Plinia inflata McVaugh

Species of plant in the myrtle family

Plinia inflata, commonly known as mulchi in Ecuador or cambucá equatoriano (Ecuadorian cambucá) in Brazil, is a species of plant in the family Myrtaceae. The tree is endemic to the Ecuadorian and Brazilian Amazon, grows to between 3 and 4 metres (9.8 and 13.1 ft) tall, and produces edible yellow-orange fruits. This plant has historically been mistaken for Eugenia subterminalis.
