= D. edulis =

D. edulis may refer to:

- Dacryodes edulis, the safou, a fruit tree species native to Africa
- Dudleya edulis, the fingertip, a succulent plant species native to southern California and Baja California

== See also ==
- Edulis (disambiguation)
