= Cutias (Carira) =

- Village
- Location of Carira in Sergipe

- Location within Brazil
- Coordinates: 10°26′9″S 37°40′35″W
- Country: Brazil
- State: Sergipe
- Municipality: Carira
- Elevation: 293 m (961 ft)
- Population (2022): 263

Cutias (Brazilian Portuguese pronunciation: [kʊˈtiɐ]) is a village in the municipality of Carira, state of Sergipe, in northeastern Brazil. As of 2022 it had a population of 263. It is named after the Portuguese word for agoutis.

== See also ==
- List of villages in Sergipe
