= Massaranduba (Carira) =

- Village
- Location of Carira in Sergipe

- Location within Brazil
- Coordinates: 10°22′11″S 37°41′6″W
- Country: Brazil
- State: Sergipe
- Municipality: Carira
- Elevation: 361 m (1,184 ft)
- Population (2022): 779

Massaranduba (Brazilian Portuguese pronunciation: [mɐsaɾɐ̃ˈdʊbɐ]) is a village in the municipality of Carira, state of Sergipe, in northeastern Brazil. As of 2022 it had a population of 779. It is named after the Portuguese word of the Manilkara plant.

== See also ==
- List of villages in Sergipe
