= Coleus maculosus =

Scientific classification
- Kingdom: Plantae
- Clade: Tracheophytes
- Clade: Angiosperms
- Clade: Eudicots
- Clade: Asterids
- Order: Lamiales
- Family: Lamiaceae
- Genus: Coleus
- Species: C. maculosus

Binomial name
- Coleus maculosus (Lam.) A.J.Paton

Synonyms
- Coleus praetermissus Bullock & Killick; Galeopsis maculosa Lam.; Germanea maculosa Lam.; Germanea punctata (L.f.) Poir.; Ocimum punctatum L.f., non Coleus punctatus Baker.; Plectranthus maculosus (Lam.) Salisb.; Plectranthus punctatus subsp. punctatus L’Hér.; Plectranthus punctatus (L.f.) L’Hér.

Species of flowering plant

Coleus maculosus is a species of flowering plant in the family Lamiaceae. It is widespread in tropical Africa and Madagascar.

Three subspecies have been described:

- Coleus maculosus subsp. maculosus – Cameroon to Eritrea and Tanzania, Madagascar.
- Coleus maculosus subsp. edulis (Vatke) A.J.Paton, syn. Plectranthus edulis (Vatke) Agnew – Ethiopia, Kenya, Uganda, Tanzania, Burundi, Rwanda and the Democratic Republic of the Congo
- Coleus maculosus subsp. lanatus (J.K.Morton) A.J.Paton – Cameroon
