= Plinia yasuniana =

Scientific classification
- Kingdom: Plantae
- Clade: Embryophytes
- Clade: Tracheophytes
- Clade: Spermatophytes
- Clade: Angiosperms
- Clade: Eudicots
- Clade: Rosids
- Order: Myrtales
- Family: Myrtaceae
- Genus: Plinia
- Species: P. yasuniana

Binomial name
- Plinia yasuniana M.L.Kawas. & Á.J.Pérez

Species of plant in the myrtle family

Plinia yasuniana is a species of plant in the family Myrtaceae. It is endemic to the understory of the Amazonian rainforest in Yasuni National Park in north-east Ecuador. The plant is a shrub that grows to between 1 and 3 metres (3 ft 3 in and 9 ft 10 in) tall. It produces cauliflorous, white flowers around 4 to 6mm long and edible, yellow fruits around 30mm in diameter, between August and November. It is named after the national park in which it was discovered in 2009.
