= Plinia rivularis =

Conservation status
- Least Concern (IUCN 3.1)

Scientific classification
- Kingdom: Plantae
- Clade: Tracheophytes
- Clade: Angiosperms
- Clade: Eudicots
- Clade: Rosids
- Order: Myrtales
- Family: Myrtaceae
- Genus: Plinia
- Species: P. rivularis

Binomial name
- Plinia rivularis (Cambess.) Rotman

Synonyms
- Eugenia hagendorffii (O.Berg) Kiaersk.; Eugenia rivularis Cambess.; Eugenia variifolia Barb.Rodr. ex Chodat & Hassl. [Invalid]; Myrcia granulata R.O.Williams; Myrcia silvatica Barb.Rodr. ex Chodat & Hassl. [Invalid]; Myrciaria baporeti D.Legrand; Myrciaria hagendorffii O.Berg; Myrciaria rivularis (Cambess.) O.Berg; Myrciaria rivularis var. baporeti (D.Legrand) D.Legrand; Myrciariopsis baporeti (D.Legrand) Kausel; Plinia baporeti (D.Legrand) Rotman; Siphoneugena baporeti (D.Legrand) Kausel; Siphoneugena legrandii Mattos & N.Silveira

Species of plant in the myrtle family

Plinia rivularis, commonly known as yva poroity, jaboticabarana, jabúriti, guapuriti, cambucá peixoto, jabuticaba de cacho, or piuna is a species of plant in the family Myrtaceae.

== Distribution ==
Plinia rivularis is found in coastal forests, Atlantic rainforest, and high elevation forests in Argentina, Paraguay, Uruguay, Brazil, French Guiana, Venezuela, and Trinidad.

== Description ==
The plant is an evergreen tree which can grow to between 6 and 11 metres (20 and 36 ft) tall. It produces edible, reddish-orange fruit, up to 20 mm (0.8 in) in diameter. The leaves are between 7.5 and 10 cm (3.0 and 3.9 in) long, and between 3 and 4 cm (1.2 and 1.6 in) wide.
