= Edulis =

Edulis, edible in Latin, is a species name present in a number of Latin species names:

- Acioa edulis, the Castanha-de-cutia, a fruit and timber tree species
- Aglaia edulis, a plant species found in Bhutan, Cambodia, China, India, Indonesia and Malaysia
- Allophylus edulis, a plant species endemic to Guyanas, Brazil, Bolivia, Paraguay, Argentina and Uruguay
- Amana edulis, a flowering bulb that is native to China, Japan, and Korea
- Boletus edulis, the cep, a mushroom species
- Brahea edulis, the Guadalupe palm or palma de Guadalupe, a palm species native and almost endemic to Guadalupe Island, Mexico
- Canna edulis, a synonym of Canna indica, the edible species of the genus Canna
- Caralluma edulis, a succulent plant species
- Carissa edulis, a synonym of Carissa spinarum, the conkerberry or bush plum, a shrub species
- Carpobrotus edulis, a creeping, mat-forming succulent plant species
- Casimiroa edulis, the white sapote, custard apple and cochitzapotl in Nahuatl, a plant species
- Catha edulis, the khat, a flowering plant species
- Commiphora edulis, (Klotzsch) Engl., a plant species in the genus Commiphora
- Cordeauxia edulis, also known as the ye'eb, yeheb or jeheb nut, a tree species
- Coula edulis, a tree species native to tropical western Africa from Sierra Leone to Angola
- Dacryodes edulis, the safou, a fruit tree species native to Africa
- Dudleya edulis (= Echeveria edulis), the fingertip, a succulent plant species native to southern California and Baja California
- Daucus edulis, a species of celery endemic to Madeira, Portugal
- Euterpe edulis, the juçara, açaí-do-sul or palmiteiro, a palm tree species
- Gymnopilus edulis, a species of mushroom in the family Cortinariaceae
- Inga edulis, a fruit native to South America
- Lithocarpus edulis, a species of stone-oak native to Japan
- Maerua edulis (Gilg. & Ben.) De Wolf, a plant species in the genus Maerua
- Metteniusa edulis, a plant species endemic to Colombia
- Mytilus edulis, the blue mussel, a medium-sized edible marine bivalve mollusc species
- Ostrea edulis, a species of oyster native to Europe
- Passiflora edulis, a plant species cultivated commercially in frost-free areas for its fruit
- Phyllostachys edulis (= Bambusa edulis), a bamboo species
- Pinus edulis, a pine species
- Plectranthus edulis, an annual plant species
- Plinia edulis, the cambucá, a tree species found in Brazil
- Pueraria edulis, a plant species belonging to the genus Pueraria
- Pyxicephalus edulis, the edible bullfrog, a frog species
- Trichonephila edulis (= Aranea edulis), a species of large spider of the family Nephilidae commonly found in Australia and in parts of New Guinea and New Caledonia

== See also ==
- Edulis (restaurant), Canadian Michelin star restaurant
- Including use as a species name
- List of Latin and Greek words commonly used in systematic names
- Edule (disambiguation), a Latin word with the same meaning
