= Plinia espinhacensis =

Conservation status
- Endangered (IUCN 3.1)

Scientific classification
- Kingdom: Plantae
- Clade: Tracheophytes
- Clade: Angiosperms
- Clade: Eudicots
- Clade: Rosids
- Order: Myrtales
- Family: Myrtaceae
- Genus: Plinia
- Species: P. espinhacensis

Binomial name
- Plinia espinhacensis Sobral

Species of plant in the myrtle family

Plinia espinhacensis is a species of flowering plant in the family Myrtaceae. It is a tree endemic to the Espinhaço Mountains in the state of Minas Gerais, Brazil. The species was first described in 2010 and grows up to 5 metres (16 ft) tall.
