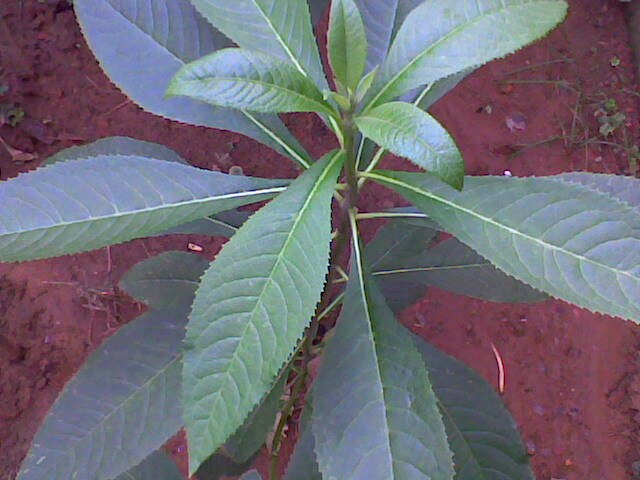
- Cabobanthus polysphaerus

Scientific classification
- Kingdom: Plantae
- Clade: Tracheophytes
- Clade: Angiosperms
- Clade: Eudicots
- Clade: Asterids
- Order: Asterales
- Family: Asteraceae
- Subfamily: Vernonioideae
- Tribe: Vernonieae
- Genus: Cabobanthus; H.Rob.

Species
- See text

= Cabobanthus =

Genus of plants in the daisy family

Cabobanthus is a genus of plants in the family Asteraceae, native to tropical Africa. Its species were formerly placed in the genus Vernonia.

== Species ==
As of September 2020, Plants of the World Online recognises the following species:

- Cabobanthus bullulatus (S.Moore) H.Rob.
- Cabobanthus polysphaerus (Baker) H.Rob.
