= Edule =

Edule, edible in Latin, may refer to:

- Cerastoderma edule, the common cockle, an edible saltwater clam species
- Cirsium edule, the edible thistle, a thistle species
- Dioon edule, a cycad native to Mexico
- Lemuropisum edule, an edible wild plant native to south west Madagascar
- Memecylon edule, a small evergreen tree native to India
- Mesembryanthemum edule, a synonym for Carpobrotus edulis, the ice plant, highway ice plant, pigface or Hottentot fig, a plant species native to South Africa
- Pangium edule, a tall tree native to the mangrove swamps of Southeast Asia
- Saccharum edule, a plant species belonging of the genus Saccharum, the sugarcane
- Sechium edule, an edible plant species
- Solanum edule, a synonym for Solanum sisymbriifolium, a plant species
- Stylophyllum edule, a synonym for Dudleya edulis, a plant species
- Viburnum edule, a small shrub species native to Canada and the northern parts of the US

== See also ==
- Including use as a species name
- List of Latin and Greek words commonly used in systematic names
- Edulis (disambiguation), a Latin word with the same meaning
