= Plinia salamancana =

Conservation status
- Data Deficient (IUCN 3.1)

Scientific classification
- Kingdom: Plantae
- Clade: Tracheophytes
- Clade: Angiosperms
- Clade: Eudicots
- Clade: Rosids
- Order: Myrtales
- Family: Myrtaceae
- Genus: Plinia
- Species: P. salamancana

Binomial name
- Plinia salamancana (Standl.) Barrie

Synonyms
- Eugenia salamancana Standl.

Species of flowering plant

Plinia salamancana is a species of flowering plant in the family Myrtaceae. It is a shrub or tree endemic to central Panama.
