= Plinia asa-grayi =

Scientific classification
- Kingdom: Plantae
- Clade: Tracheophytes
- Clade: Angiosperms
- Clade: Eudicots
- Clade: Rosids
- Order: Myrtales
- Family: Myrtaceae
- Genus: Plinia
- Species: P. asa-grayi

Binomial name
- Plinia asa-grayi (Krug & Urb.) Urb.

Synonyms
- Eugenia asa-grayi Krug & Urb.

Species of flowering plant

Plinia asa-grayi is a species of flowering plant in the family Myrtaceae. It is a shrub native to central and eastern Cuba.
