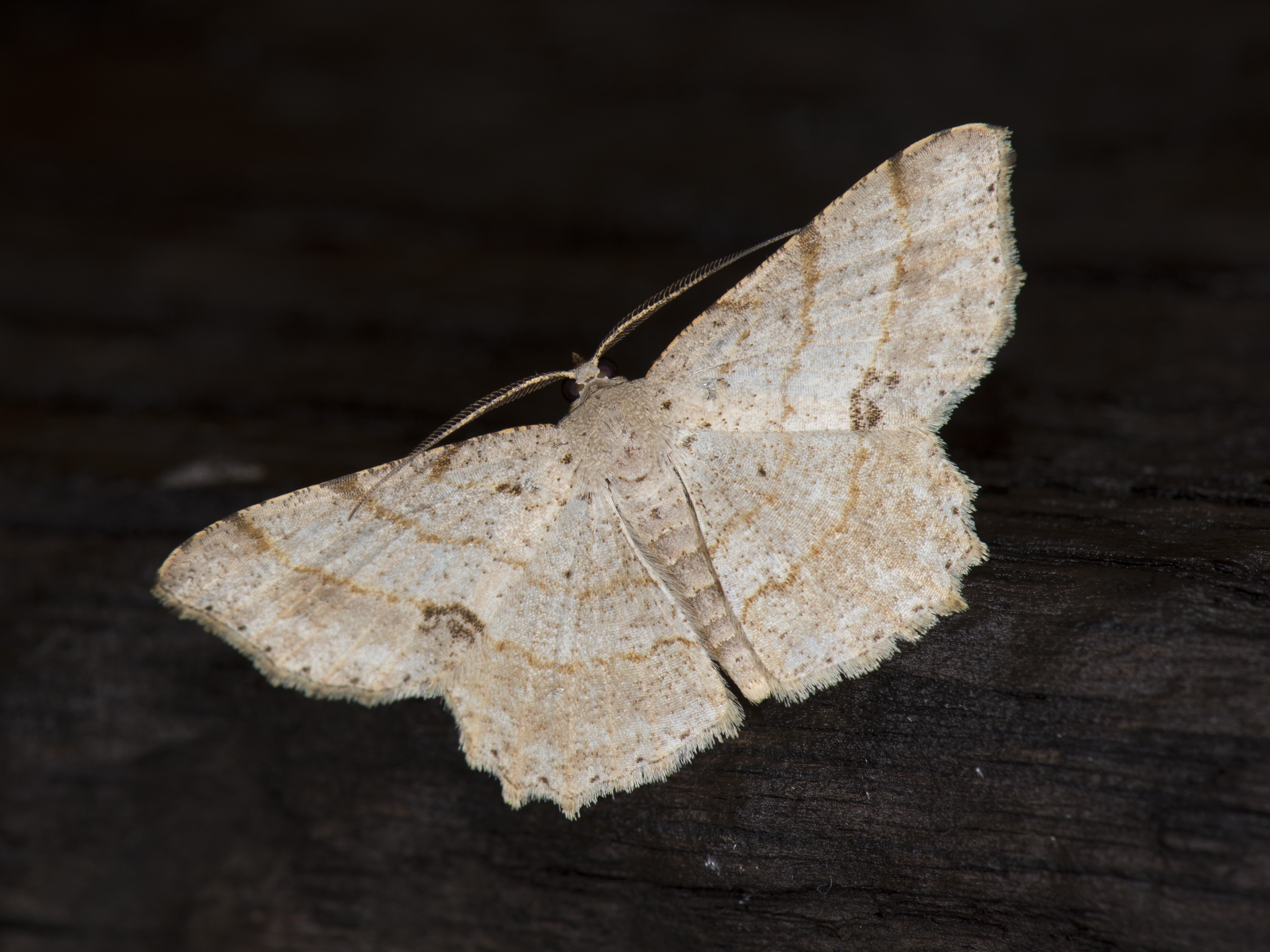
- Calletaera basipuncta

Scientific classification
- Kingdom: Animalia
- Phylum: Arthropoda
- Class: Insecta
- Order: Lepidoptera
- Family: Geometridae
- Subfamily: Ennominae
- Genus: Calletaera; Warren, 1895

= Calletaera =

Genus of moths

Calletaera is a genus of moths in the family Geometridae.

== Species ==
The following species are recognised in the genus Calletaera:

- Calletaera acuticornuta Jiang et al., 2014
- Calletaera basipuncta Wileman, 1916
- Calletaera consimilaria (Leech, 1897) Leech, 1897
- Calletaera dentata Jiang et al., 2014
- Calletaera digrammata Wehrli, 1925
- Calletaera foveata Holloway, 1993
- Calletaera jotaria Felder & Rogenhofer, 1875
- Calletaera obvia Jiang et al., 2014
- Calletaera postvittata (Walker, 1861)
- Calletaera rotundicornuta Jiang et al., 2014
- Calletaera sabulosa Warren, 1895
- Calletaera schistacea Swinhoe, 1900
- Calletaera subexpressa (Walker, 1861)
- Calletaera subgravata (Prout, 1932)
- Calletaera trigonoprocessus Jiang et al., 2014
- BOLD:ADF1208 (Calletaera sp.)
