= Cabobanthus bullulatus =

Scientific classification
- Kingdom: Plantae
- Clade: Tracheophytes
- Clade: Angiosperms
- Clade: Eudicots
- Clade: Asterids
- Order: Asterales
- Family: Asteraceae
- Genus: Cabobanthus
- Species: C. bullulatus

Binomial name
- Cabobanthus bullulatus (S.Moore) H.Rob.

Synonyms
- Vernonia bullulata S.Moore; Vernonia kwangolana P.A.Duvign. & Hotyat

Species of plant in the daisy family

Cabobanthus bullulatus is a plant in the family Asteraceae, native to tropical Africa.

== Description ==
Cabobanthus bullulatus grows as a herb, measuring up to 1 metre (3 ft) tall, occasionally to 2 m (7 ft). The almost sessile leaves are oblong to oblanceolate and measure up to 11 cm (4 in) long. The capitula feature about 10 mauve florets. The fruits are achenes.

== Distribution and habitat ==
Cabobanthus bullulatus is native to the Democratic Republic of the Congo, Angola and Zambia.
