= Plinia rogersiana =

Conservation status
- Critically endangered, possibly extinct (IUCN 3.1)

Scientific classification
- Kingdom: Plantae
- Clade: Embryophytes
- Clade: Tracheophytes
- Clade: Spermatophytes
- Clade: Angiosperms
- Clade: Eudicots
- Clade: Rosids
- Order: Myrtales
- Family: Myrtaceae
- Genus: Plinia
- Species: P. rogersiana

Binomial name
- Plinia rogersiana Mattos

Species of plant in the myrtle family

Plinia rogersiana is a species of plant in the family Myrtaceae. It is endemic to the state of São Paulo in the south-east of Brazil. It is considered critically endangered, possibly extinct.
