= Plinia complanata =

Scientific classification
- Kingdom: Plantae
- Clade: Embryophytes
- Clade: Tracheophytes
- Clade: Spermatophytes
- Clade: Angiosperms
- Clade: Eudicots
- Clade: Rosids
- Order: Myrtales
- Family: Myrtaceae
- Genus: Plinia
- Species: P. complanata

Binomial name
- Plinia complanata M.L.Kawas. & B.Holst

Species of plant in the myrtle family

Plinia complanata, is a species of plant in the family Myrtaceae. It was discovered in the coastal forests of São Paulo (state), Brazil, and first described in 2002.
