= Plinia pauciflora =

Conservation status
- Data Deficient (IUCN 3.1)

Scientific classification
- Kingdom: Plantae
- Clade: Tracheophytes
- Clade: Angiosperms
- Clade: Eudicots
- Clade: Rosids
- Order: Myrtales
- Family: Myrtaceae
- Genus: Plinia
- Species: P. pauciflora

Binomial name
- Plinia pauciflora M.L.Kawas. & B.Holst

Species of plant in the myrtle family

Plinia pauciflora, is a species of flowering plant in the family Myrtaceae. It is a tree endemic to southeastern Brazil. It was discovered in the coastal forests of São Paulo state, and first described in 2002.
