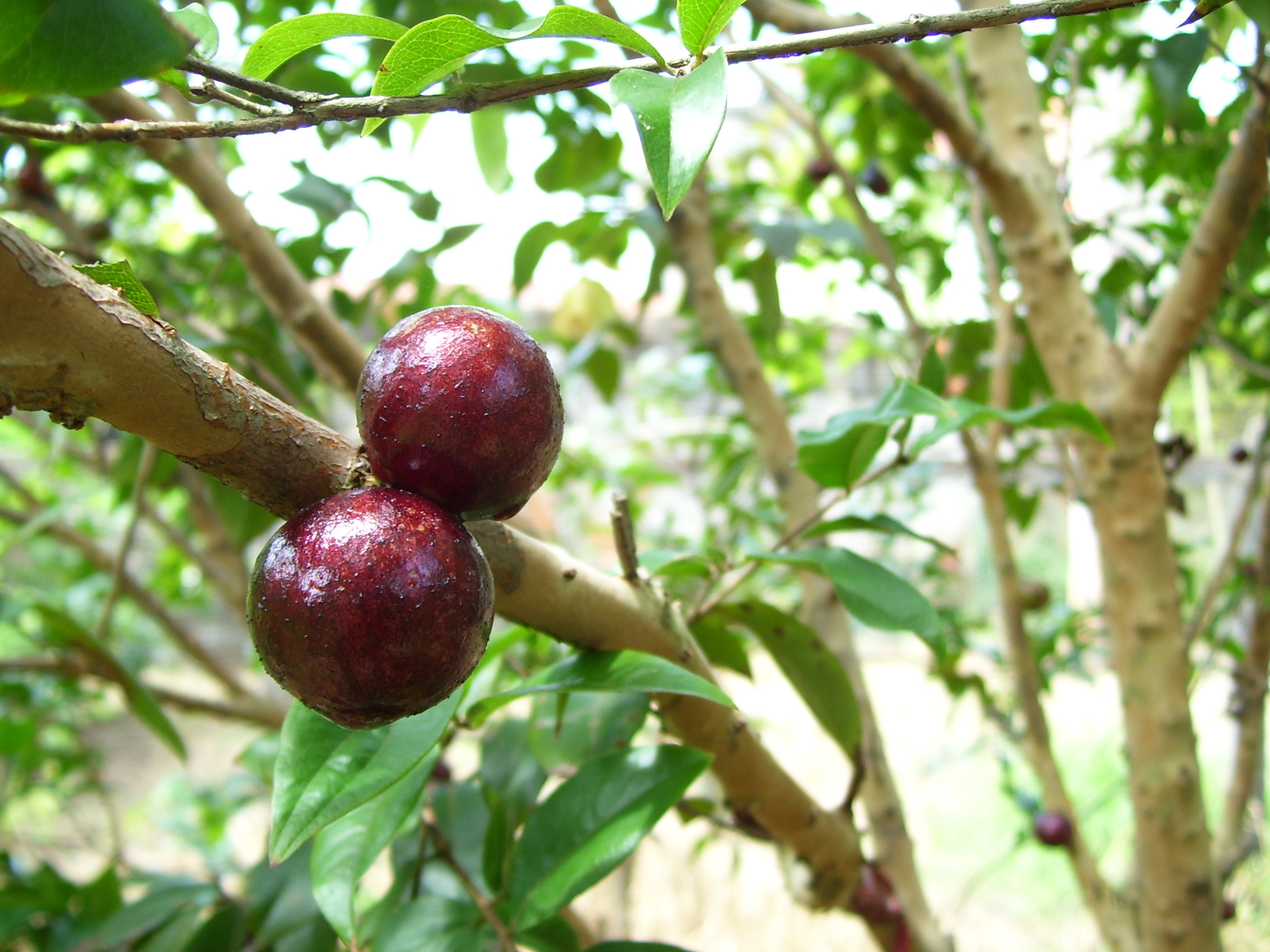
- P. cauliflora

Scientific classification
- Kingdom: Plantae
- Clade: Tracheophytes
- Clade: Angiosperms
- Clade: Eudicots
- Clade: Rosids
- Order: Myrtales
- Family: Myrtaceae
- Subfamily: Myrtoideae
- Tribe: Myrteae
- Genus: Plinia; L.

Synonyms
- Guapurium Juss.; Guapurum J.F.Gmel.; Rubachia O.Berg

= Plinia =

Genus of flowering plants in the myrtle family

Plinia is a genus of flowering plants in the myrtle family, Myrtaceae described by Linnaeus in 1753. It is native to Central and South America as well as the West Indies.

== Species ==
69 species are accepted.

- Plinia abeggii (Urb. & Ekman) Urb. – Hispaniola
- Plinia acreana M.A.D.Souza & Sobral – Acre
- Plinia amazonica Sobral, M.A.D.Souza & D.K.D.Caldas – Amapá and Mato Grosso
- Plinia ambivalens M.C.Souza & Sobral – eastern Brazil
- Plinia anonyma Sobral – SE Brazil – southeastern Brazil
- Plinia asa-grayi (Krug & Urb.) Urb. – Cuba
- Plinia brachybotrya (D.Legrand) Sobral – S Brazil
- Plinia callosa Sobral – Bahia
- Plinia cauliflora (Mart.) Kausel (synonym Plinia peruviana (Juss. ex J.F.Gmel.) Govaerts) – Bolivia, southern and eastern Brazil
- Plinia cerrocampanensis Barrie – Panama
- Plinia clausa McVaugh – northern Peru
- Plinia coclensis Barrie – Panama
- Plinia complanata M.L.Kawas. & B.Holst – São Paulo
- Plinia cordifolia (D.Legrand) Sobral – S Brazil
- Plinia coronata (Mattos) Mattos – SE Brazil
- Plinia costaricensis M.Carranza & P.E.Sánchez – Costa Rica
- Plinia costata Amshoff – Guyana, Suriname
- Plinia cuspidata Gómez-Laur. & Valverde – Costa Rica, Panama
- Plinia darienensis Barrie – Panama
- Plinia delicata Antunes, Salimena & Sobral – Minas Gerais
- Plinia duplipilosa McVaugh – Loreto
- Plinia edulis (Vell.) Sobral – S Brazil, NE Argentina
- Plinia espinhacensis Sobral – Minas Gerais
- Plinia gentryi Barrie – Panama
- Plinia grandifolia (Mattos) Sobral – S Brazil
- Plinia guanacastensis Barrie – Costa Rica
- Plinia hatschbachii (Mattos) Sobral – Paraná
- Plinia humaitana M.A.D.Souza & Sobral – Amazonas (Brazil)
- Plinia impressa M.A.D.Souza & Sobral – Amazonas (Brazil)
- Plinia inflata McVaugh – N Brazil
- Plinia involucrata (O.Berg) McVaugh – N Brazil, Venezuela
- Plinia langsdorffii (O.Berg) Sobral & M.C.Souza – southeastern Brazil
- Plinia longa Sobral & M.C.Souza – Espírito Santo
- Plinia longiacuminata Sobral – Bahia
- Plinia moralesii Barrie – Costa Rica
- Plinia muricata Sobral – Bahia
- Plinia nana Sobral – Minas Gerais
- Plinia nicaraguensis Barrie – Costa Rica, Nicaragua
- Plinia oblongata (Mattos) Mattos – São Paulo
- Plinia oblongifolia Á.J.Pérez, M.L.Kawas. & B.Holst – Ecuador
- Plinia panamensis Barrie – Panama
- Plinia parvifolia (O.Berg) Stadnik & Sobral – northeastern Brazil
- Plinia pauciflora M.L.Kawas. & B.Holst – São Paulo
- Plinia peroblata (Lundell) Lundell – Belize
- Plinia phitrantha (Kiaersk.) Sobral – São Paulo, Minas Gerais
- Plinia pinnata L. – Lesser Antilles, Trinidad
- Plinia povedae P.E.Sánchez – Guatemala, Costa Rica, Panama
- Plinia pseudodichasiantha (Kiaersk.) G.M.Barroso ex Sobral – southeastern Brazil
- Plinia pumila (Gardner) M.C.Souza & Sobral – Rio de Janeiro
- Plinia puriscalensis P.E.Sánchez & Q.Jiménez – Costa Rica
- Plinia rara Sobral – Bahia
- Plinia renatiana G.M.Barroso & Peixoto – Espírito Santo
- Plinia rivularis (Cambess.) Rotman – Trinidad, Venezuela, Brazil, Paraguay, Uruguay, NE Argentina
- Plinia rogersiana Mattos – São Paulo
- Plinia rufiflora Sobral & M.A.D.Souza
- Plinia salamancana (Standl.) Barrie – Panama
- Plinia salticola McVaugh – Costa Rica, Panama
- Plinia sessiliflora (O.Berg) Stadnik & Sobral – Rio de Janeiro
- Plinia silvestris (Vell.) Mazine & Sobral – southeastern Brazil
- Plinia spiciflora (Nees & Mart.) Sobral – E Brazil
- Plinia spirito-santensis (Mattos) Mattos – SE Brazil
- Plinia subavenia Sobral – Espírito Santo, Bahia
- Plinia sulcata (Burret) M.C.Souza & D.K.D.Caldas – Rio de Janeiro and São Paulo
- Plinia tapuruquarana M.A.D.Souza & Sobral – Amazonas (Brazil)
- Plinia trunciflora (O.Berg) Kausel – northeastern Argentina, Bolivia, central and southern Brazil, Paraguay, and Peru
- Plinia valenciana M.L.Kawas. & Á.J.Pérez – northeastern Ecuador
- Plinia vilabela Stadnik & Sobral – Mato Grosso
- Plinia yasuniana M.L.Kawas. & Á.J.Pérez – Yasuni National Park, Ecuador
- Plinia ybotyrype Stadnik – Bahia

=== Formerly placed here ===
- Eugenia martinellii (G.M.Barroso & M.Peron) Stadnik, D.K.D.Caldas & M.C.Souza, as Plinia martinellii G.M.Barroso & M.Peron
- Eugenia sebastianopolitana (G.M.Barroso) Stadnik, D.K.D.Caldas & M.C.Souza, as Plinia ilhensis G.M.Barroso and P. sebastianopolitana G.M.Barroso
- Myrciaria cidrensis (Urb.) Z.Acosta & García-Beltrán, as Plinia cidrensis Urb.
- Myrciaria dermatodes (Urb.) Z.Acosta & García-Beltrán, as Plinia dermatodes Urb.
- Myrcia ekmaniana (Urb.) M.F.Santos, as Plinia ekmaniana
- Myrciaria formosa (Urb.) Z.Acosta & García-Beltrán, as Plinia formosa Urb.
- Myrciaria icardiana (Urb.) Z.Acosta & García-Beltrán, as Plinia icardiana Urb.
- Myrciaria microcycla (Urb.) Z.Acosta & García-Beltrán, as Plinia microcycla Urb. – Dominican Rep
- Myrciaria moaensis (Borhidi) Z.Acosta & García-Beltrán, as Plinia moaensis Borhidi – Cuba
- Myrciaria orthoclada (Urb.) Z.Acosta & García-Beltrán, as Plinia orthoclada Urb. – Cuba
- Myrciaria punctata (Urb.) Z.Acosta & García-Beltrán, as Plinia punctata Urb.
- Myrciaria ramosissima (Urb.) Z.Acosta & García-Beltrán, as Plinia ramosissima Urb. – Cuba
- †Myrciaria recurvata (Urb.) Z.Acosta & García-Beltrán, as Plinia recurvata Urb.
- Myrciaria stenophylla (Urb.) Z.Acosta & García-Beltrán, as Plinia stenophylla Urb.
