= Plinia coronata =

Conservation status
- Data Deficient (IUCN 3.1)

Scientific classification
- Kingdom: Plantae
- Clade: Tracheophytes
- Clade: Angiosperms
- Clade: Eudicots
- Clade: Rosids
- Order: Myrtales
- Family: Myrtaceae
- Genus: Plinia
- Species: P. coronata

Binomial name
- Plinia coronata (Mattos) Mattos

Synonyms
- Myrciaria coronata Mattos

Species of plant in the myrtle family

Plinia coronata, commonly known as jaboticaba coroada (king jabuticaba), is a species of plant in the family Myrtaceae. It is endemic to south-eastern Brazil. The tree grows to between 4 and 12 metres (13 and 39 ft) tall, and produces purple, edible fruit, which is between 25 and 30 mm (1.0 and 1.2 in) in diameter.
