= Plinia spirito-santensis =

Scientific classification
- Kingdom: Plantae
- Clade: Embryophytes
- Clade: Tracheophytes
- Clade: Spermatophytes
- Clade: Angiosperms
- Clade: Eudicots
- Clade: Rosids
- Order: Myrtales
- Family: Myrtaceae
- Genus: Plinia
- Species: P. spirito-santensis

Binomial name
- Plinia spirito-santensis (Mattos) Mattos

Synonyms
- Myrciaria spirito-santensis Mattos

Species of plant in the myrtle family

Plinia spirito-santensis, commonly known as jabuticaba peluda de cruz (hairy cross jaboticaba) or Grimal in the United States, is a species of plant in the family Myrtaceae. It is endemic to broad-leafed coastal forests, at altitude, in eastern Brazil. The plant is a semideciduous shrub or small tree which can grow to between 3 and 6 metres (9.8 and 20 ft) tall. It produces edible deep reddish-purple berries, up to 30 mm (1.2 in) in diameter. At the apex of the fruit there is a small cross, from which the name derives.

In the US, this species is commonly named after Adolf Grimal, who collected this variety in South America and introduced it to Florida.
