= Plinia grandifolia =

Conservation status
- Near Threatened (IUCN 3.1)

Scientific classification
- Kingdom: Plantae
- Clade: Tracheophytes
- Clade: Angiosperms
- Clade: Eudicots
- Clade: Rosids
- Order: Myrtales
- Family: Myrtaceae
- Genus: Plinia
- Species: P. grandifolia

Binomial name
- Plinia grandifolia (Mattos) Sobral

Synonyms
- Myrciaria grandifolia Mattos

Species of plant in the myrtle family

Plinia grandifolia, commonly known as jaboticaba graúda (large jaboticaba), is a species of plant in the family Myrtaceae. It is endemic to south-eastern Brazil, and is found almost exclusively in the under-story of the Atlantic Rainforest. The tree grows to between 4 and 8 metres (13 and 26 ft) tall, and produces dark-purple, edible fruit, between 15 and 25 mm (0.6 and 1.0 in) in diameter.
