= Plinia oblongata =

Conservation status
- Data Deficient (IUCN 3.1)

Scientific classification
- Kingdom: Plantae
- Clade: Tracheophytes
- Clade: Angiosperms
- Clade: Eudicots
- Clade: Rosids
- Order: Myrtales
- Family: Myrtaceae
- Genus: Plinia
- Species: P. oblongata

Binomial name
- Plinia oblongata (Mattos) Mattos

Synonyms
- Myrciaria oblongata Mattos

Species of plant in the myrtle family

Plinia oblongata, commonly known as jaboticaba azeda (sour jabuticaba), is a species of flowering plant in the family Myrtaceae. It is a shrub or tree endemic to south-eastern Brazil. The tree grows to between 4 and 6 metres (13 and 20 ft) tall, and produces dark-purple, acidic but edible fruit, which is between 25 and 30 mm (0.98 and 1.18 in) in diameter.
