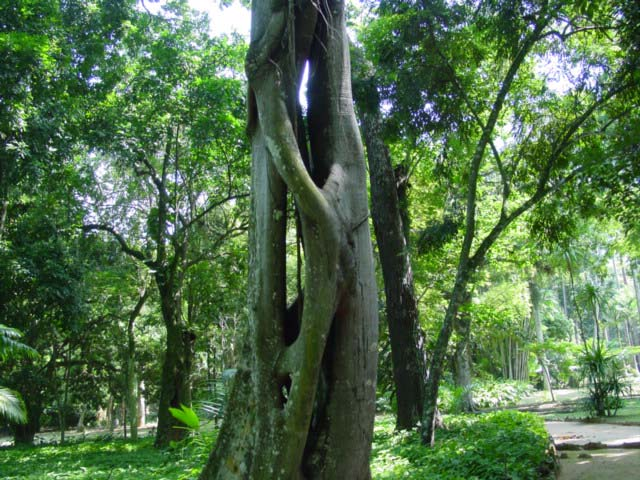

Scientific classification
- Kingdom: Plantae
- Clade: Tracheophytes
- Clade: Angiosperms
- Clade: Eudicots
- Clade: Rosids
- Order: Rosales
- Family: Moraceae
- Genus: Ficus
- Species: F. clusiifolia

Binomial name
- Ficus clusiifolia Schott

Synonyms
- Ficus anacardiifolia Kunth & C.D.Bouché; Ficus grisea Vahl; Ficus inclusa Warb. ex Glaz.; Ficus involucrata Warb. ex Glaz.; Ficus splendens Kunth & C.D.Bouché; Urostigma anacardiifolum (Kunth & C.D.Bouché) Miq.; Urostigma clusiifolium (Schott) Miq.; Urostigma griseum (Vahl) Miq.; Urostigma splendens (Kunth & C.D.Bouché) Miq.

= Ficus clusiifolia =

Species of flowering plant

Ficus clusiifolia is a species of flowering plant in the family Moraceae. It is a tree endemic to eastern Brazil.

The species was first described by Heinrich Wilhelm Schott in 1827.
