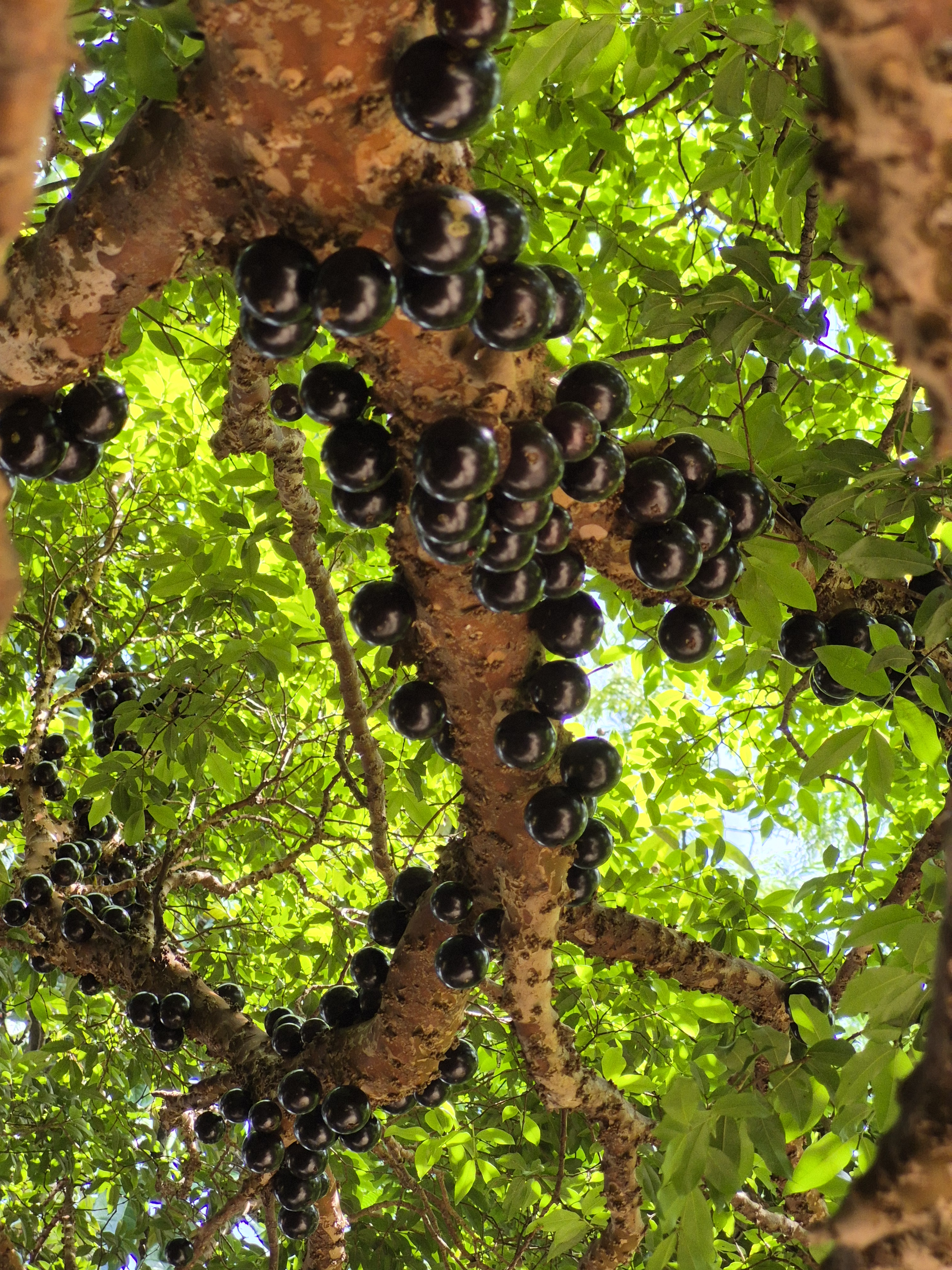

Conservation status
- Least Concern (IUCN 3.1)

Scientific classification
- Kingdom: Plantae
- Clade: Tracheophytes
- Clade: Angiosperms
- Clade: Eudicots
- Clade: Rosids
- Order: Myrtales
- Family: Myrtaceae
- Genus: Plinia
- Species: P. cauliflora

Binomial name
- Plinia cauliflora (Mart.) Kausel

Synonyms
- Synonymy: Eugenia cauliflora (Mart.) DC.; Eugenia guapurium DC., nom. illeg. superfl.; Eugenia jaboticaba (Vell.) Kiaersk.; Guapurium peruvianum Juss. ex J.F.Gmel.; Myrcia jaboticaba (Vell.) Baill.; Myrciaria cauliflora (Mart.) O.Berg; Myrciaria guapurium O.Berg, nom. illeg. superfl.; Myrciaria jaboticaba (Vell.) O.Berg; Myrciaria peruviana (Juss. ex J.F.Gmel.) Mattos; Myrtus cauliflora Mart.; Myrtus jaboticaba Vell.; Plinia jaboticaba (Vell.) Kausel; Plinia peruviana (Juss. ex J.F.Gmel.) Govaerts

= Plinia cauliflora =

Jaboticaba

Fruit tree in the myrtle family

A jaboticaba (/dʒæbɒtɪˈkɑːbə/) or jabuticaba (Portuguese: [ʒabutʃiˈkabɐ]) is a round, edible fruit produced by a jaboticaba tree (Plinia cauliflora), also known as Brazilian grapetree. The purplish-black, white-pulped fruit grows directly on the trunk of the tree, making it an example of 'cauliflory'. It is eaten raw or used to make jellies, jams, juice or wine. The tree, of the family Myrtaceae, is native Bolivia and to the states of Rio de Janeiro, Minas Gerais, Goiás and São Paulo in Brazil. Related species in the genus Myrciaria, often referred to by the same common names, are native to Brazil, Argentina, Paraguay, Peru and Bolivia. Jaboticaba tree is also grown as an ornamental and bonsai.

== Etymology ==
The name jaboticaba derives from the Tupi word îaboti, Lusitanized as jaboti/jabuti (tortoise) + kaba (place), meaning "the place where tortoises are found"; it has also been interpreted to mean 'like turtle fat', referring to the fruit's white pulp. It may also derive from ïapotï'kaba meaning "fruits in a bud".

The Guarani name is yvapurũ: yva means fruit and the onomatopoeic word purũ, from pururũ, describes the crunching sound the fruit produces when bitten.

== Description ==
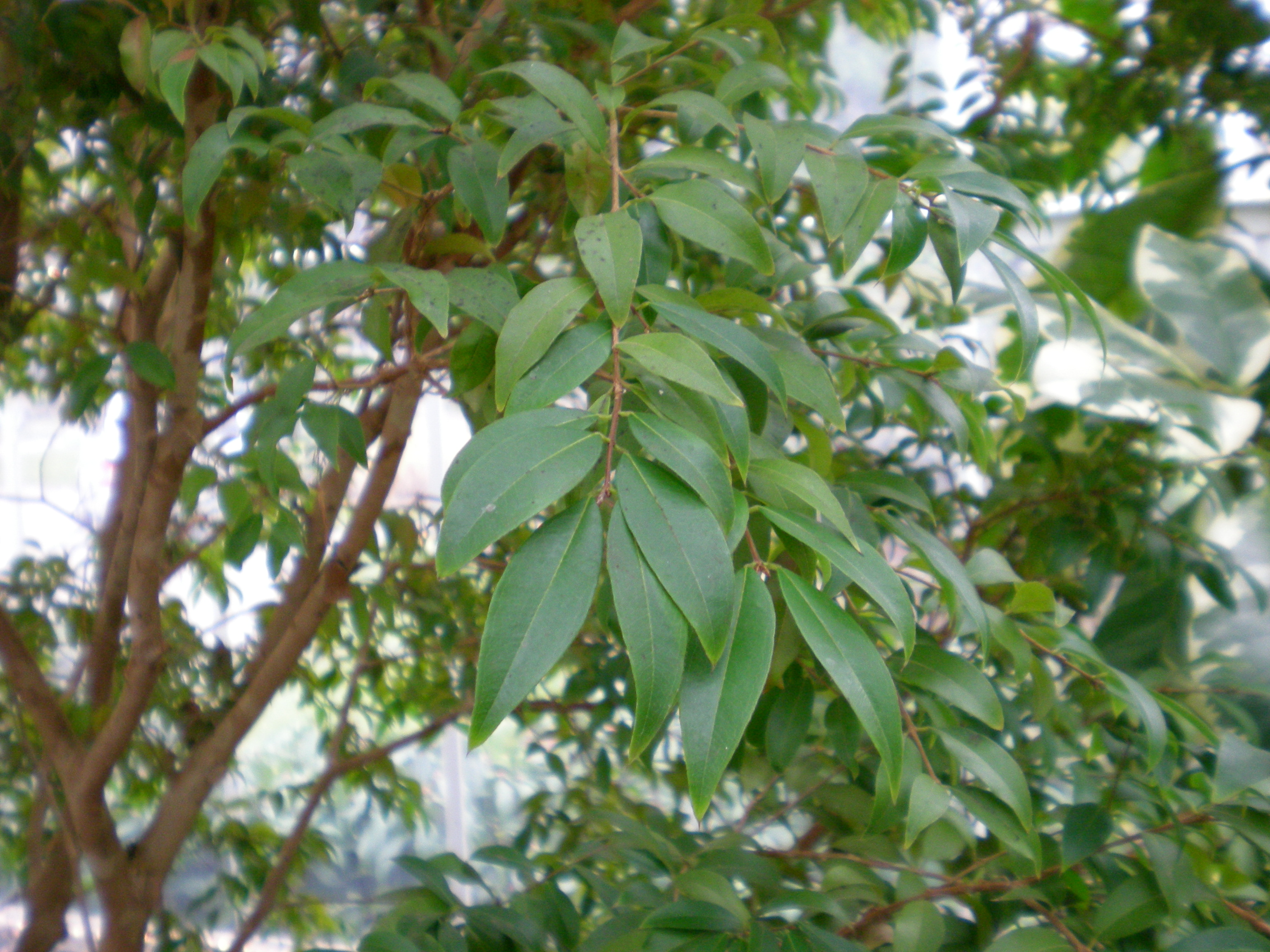
Leaves of Plinia cauliflora

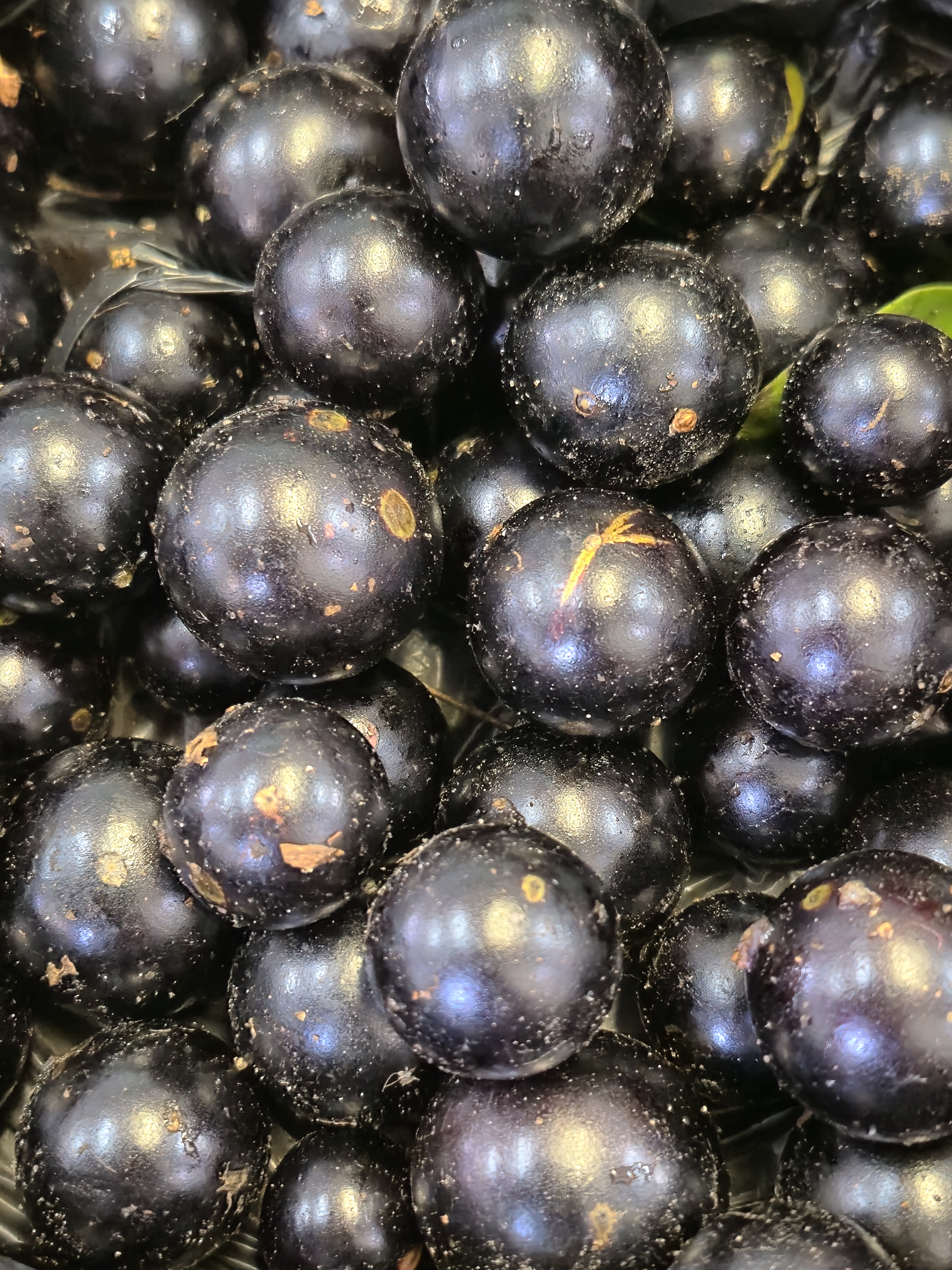
Freshly harvested fruits

=== Plant ===
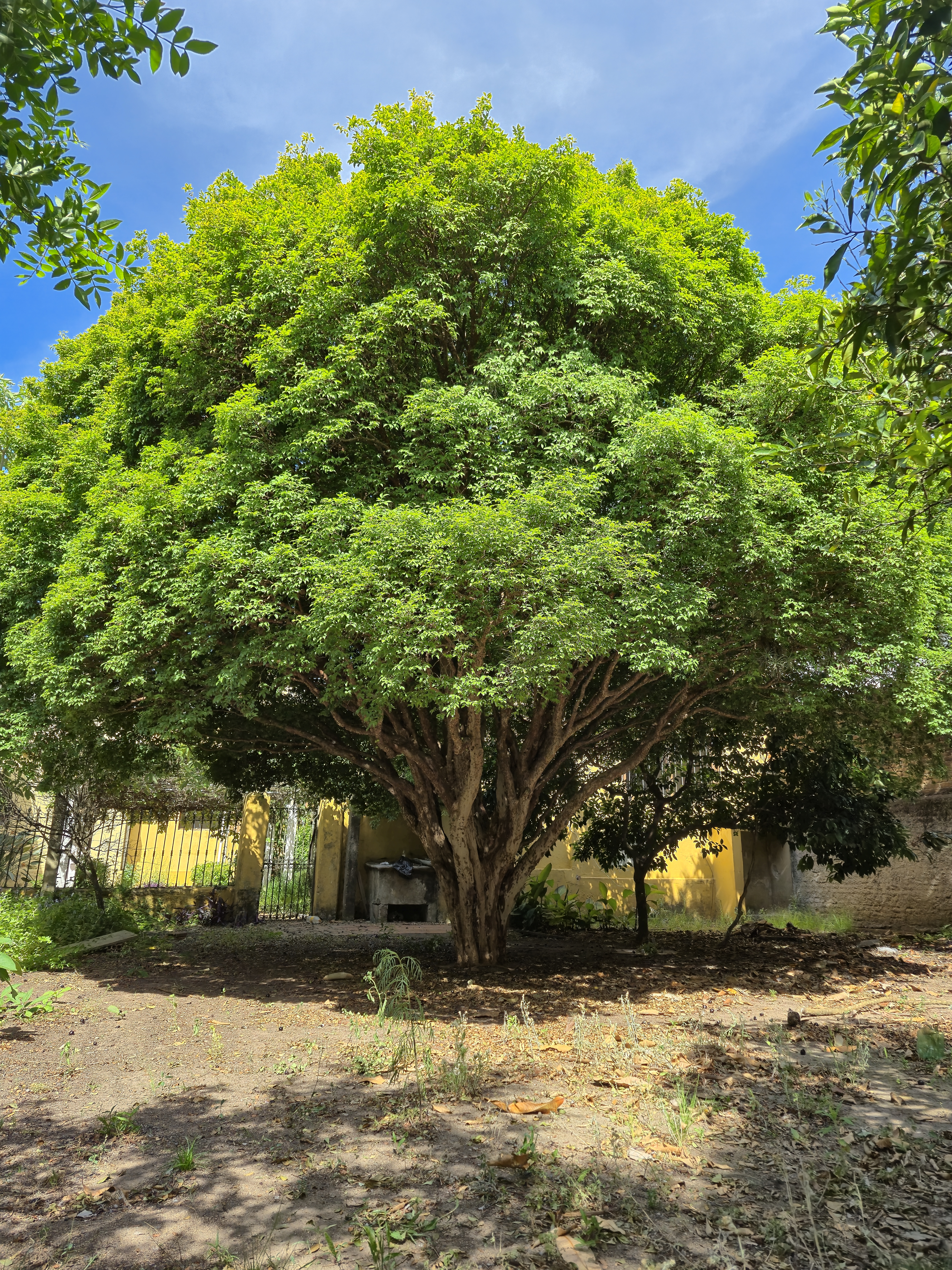
Tree in the state of Rio Grande do Sul, Brazil

The tree is a slow-growing evergreen that can reach 15 meters (49 ft) if not pruned. The leaves are salmon-pink when young, turning green as they mature.

The tree prefers moist, rich, lightly acidic soil. It is widely adaptable, however, and grows satisfactorily even on alkaline beach-sand type soils, so long as it is tended and irrigated. Its flowers are white and grow directly from the trunk in a cauliflorous habit. In their native habitat, jaboticaba trees may flower and fruit five to six times a year. Jaboticaba trees are tropical to subtropical plants and can tolerate mild, brief frosts, but not below 26 °F (-3 °C).

The tree has a compact, fibrous root system, which makes it suitable for growing in pots or transplanting.

=== Fruit ===
The fruit is a thick-skinned berry and typically measures 3–4 centimetres (1.2–1.6 in) in diameter. The fruit resembles a slip-skin grape. It has a thick, purple, astringent skin that encases a sweet, white or rosy pink gelatinous flesh. Embedded within the flesh are one to four large seeds, which vary in shape depending on the species. Jaboticaba seeds are recalcitrant and they lose viability within 10 days when stored at room temperature.

In Brazil, the fruit of several related species in the Plinia and Myrciaria genera share the same common name.

== Production and cultivation ==
Jaboticabas have been cultivated in Brazil since pre-Columbian times. Today, the fruit is a commercial crop in the central and southern parts of the country.

Commercial cultivation of the fruit in the Northern Hemisphere is more restricted by slow growth and the short shelf life of the fruit than by temperature requirements. Grafted plants may bear fruit in five years, while seed-grown trees may take 10 to 20 years to bear fruit.

Jaboticaba trees are fairly adaptable to various growing conditions, tolerating sand or rich topsoil. They are intolerant of salty soils or salt spray. They are tolerant of mild drought, though fruit production may be reduced, and irrigation is required in extended or severe droughts.

Jaboticaba trees are vulnerable to rust, Austropuccinia psidii, particularly when the tree flowers during heavy rain. Other important diseases that affect jaboticaba trees include canker (Colletotrichum gloeosporioides), dieback (Rosellinia), and fruit rot (Botrytis cinerea).

== Uses ==
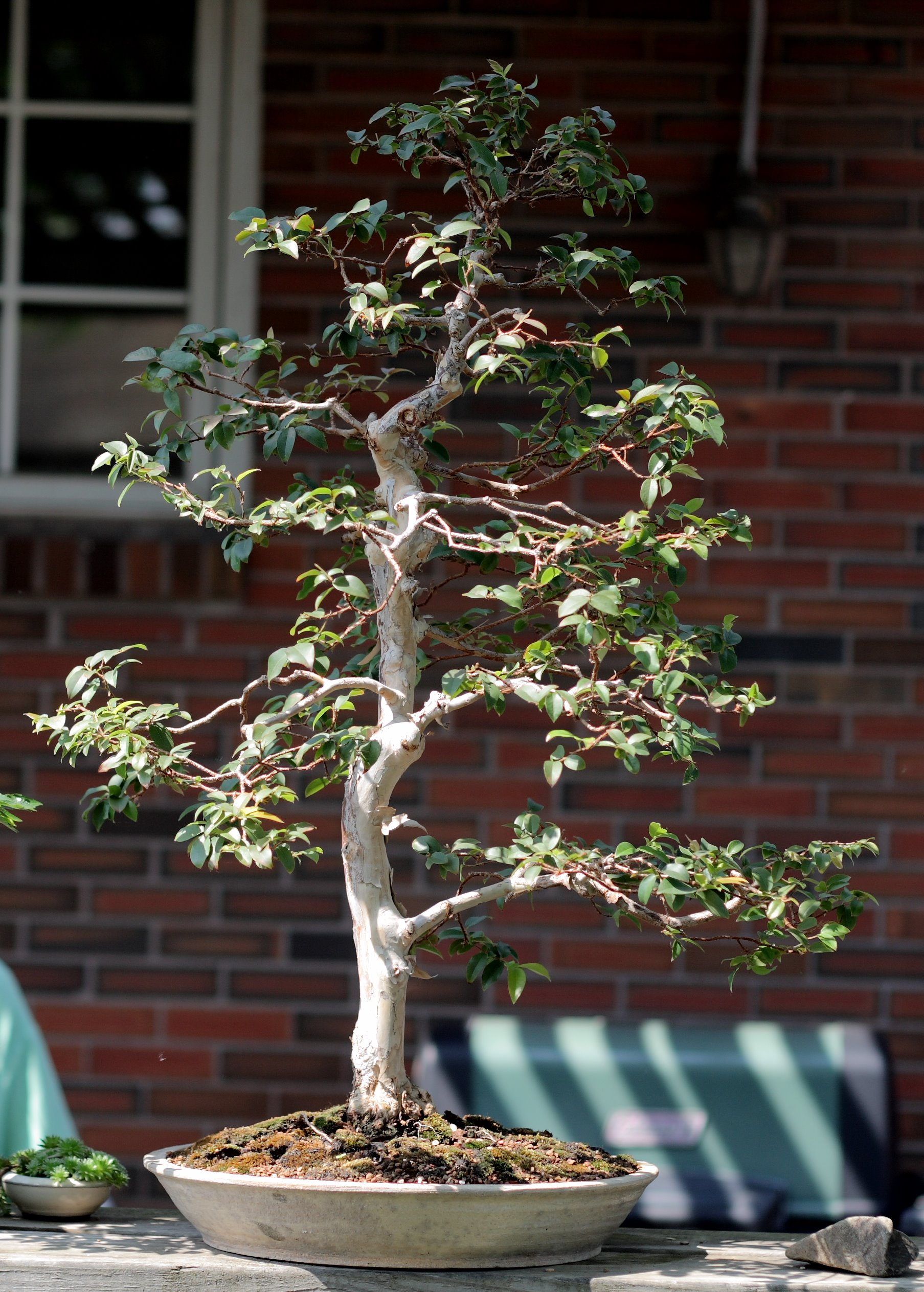
Jaboticaba bonsai

=== Culinary ===
Common in Brazilian markets, jaboticabas are largely eaten fresh. Fruit may begin to ferment 3 to 4 days after harvest, so it is often used to make jams, tarts, strong wines, and liqueurs. Due to its short shelf-life, fresh jaboticaba is rare in markets outside areas of cultivation.

The fruit has been compared to Muscadine grapes, and in Japan the flavor of jaboticaba has been described as similar to that of Kyoho grapes.

=== Bonsai ===
Because of their slow growth and small size when immature, jaboticaba trees are popular as bonsai or container ornamental plants in temperate regions. The tree is a widely used bonsai species in Taiwan and parts of the Caribbean.

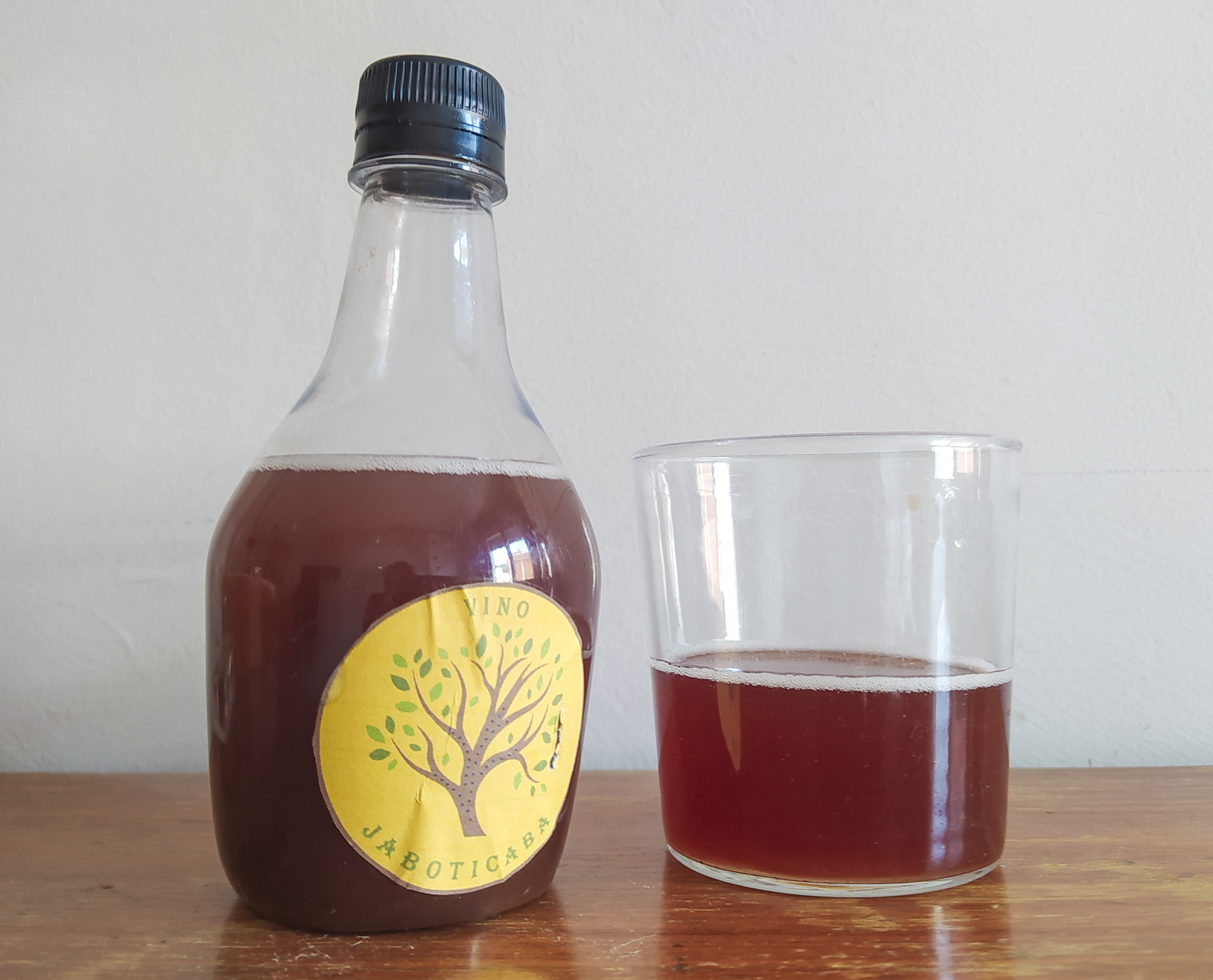
Jaboticaba wine, a traditional wine from Varre-Sai produced by Italian Brazilians since the 19th century

== Cultural significance ==
The jaboticaba tree appears as a charge on the coat of arms of Contagem, Minas Gerais, Brazil.

In Brazilian politics, and less commonly in everyday speech, "jabuticaba" is a slang that describes a political or legal setting that is considered absurd, unusual, or needlessly complex, among others, that could only exist in Brazil. It is a reference to the popular belief that jaboticaba trees can only grow in Brazil.

== Related species ==
A number of similar species of plant in the family Myrtaceae produce fruit that is also known by the common name jaboticaba.

- Myrciaria glazioviana (jabuticaba amarela or yellow jaboticaba)
- Myrciaria tenella (jabuticaba macia or soft jaboticaba)
- Plinia coronata (jabuticaba coroada or king jaboticaba)
- Plinia grandifolia (jabuticaba graúda or large jaboticaba)
- Plinia martinellii (jabuticabinha da mata or little forest jaboticaba)
- Plinia oblongata (jabuticaba azeda or sour jaboticaba)
- Plinia peruviana (jabuticaba cabinho or small stemmed jaboticaba)
- Plinia phitrantha (jabuticaba branca or white jaboticaba)
- Plinia rivularis (jabuticaba de cacho or bunched jaboticaba)
- Plinia spirito-santensis (jabuticaba peluda de cruz, hairy cross jaboticaba)
