= Plinia phitrantha =

Conservation status
- Near Threatened (IUCN 3.1)

Scientific classification
- Kingdom: Plantae
- Clade: Tracheophytes
- Clade: Angiosperms
- Clade: Eudicots
- Clade: Rosids
- Order: Myrtales
- Family: Myrtaceae
- Genus: Plinia
- Species: P. phitrantha

Binomial name
- Plinia phitrantha (Kiaersk.) Sobral

Synonyms
- Eugenia phitrantha Kiaersk.; Myrciaria aureana Mattos; Myrciaria phitrantha (Kiaersk.) Mattos; Plinia aureana (Mattos) Mattos

Species of plant in the myrtle family

Plinia phitrantha, commonly known as jaboticaba branca (white jaboticaba) or ibatinga (Tupi-Guarani for white fruit), is a species of plant in the family Myrtaceae. It is endemic to the states of São Paulo and Minas Gerais in south-eastern Brazil. The tree grows to between 2 and 7 metres (6.6 and 23 ft) tall, and produces edible fruit, between 10 and 25 mm (0.4 and 1 in) in diameter, which is green in colour due to a lack of anthocyanins in the skin.
