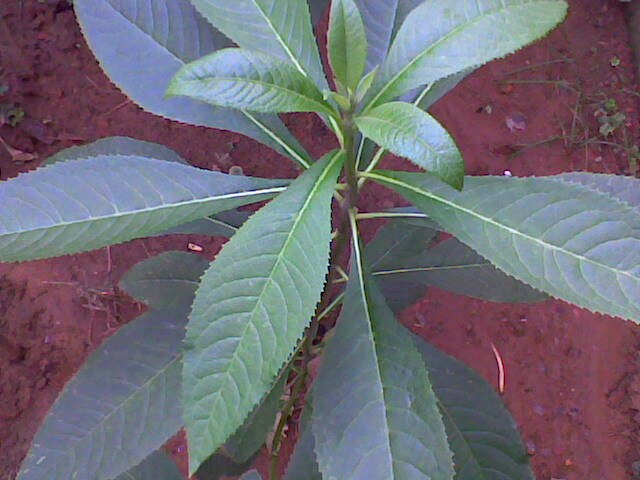

Scientific classification
- Kingdom: Plantae
- Clade: Tracheophytes
- Clade: Angiosperms
- Clade: Eudicots
- Clade: Asterids
- Order: Asterales
- Family: Asteraceae
- Genus: Cabobanthus
- Species: C. polysphaerus

Binomial name
- Cabobanthus polysphaerus (Baker) H.Rob.

Synonyms
- Vernonia homblei De Wild.; Vernonia polysphaera Baker

= Cabobanthus polysphaerus =

Species of plant in the daisy family

Cabobanthus polysphaerus is a plant in the family Asteraceae, native to tropical Africa.

== Description ==
Cabobanthus polysphaerus grows as a herb, measuring up to 1.2 metres (4 ft) tall. The sessile leaves are oblong and measure up to 7 cm (3 in) long. The capitula feature about 5 purple flowers. The fruits are achenes.

== Distribution and habitat ==
Cabobanthus polysphaerus is native to the Democratic Republic of the Congo, Tanzania, Angola and Zambia. Its habitat is in bushland to an altitude of 1,830 m (6,000 ft).
