= Jaboticaba, Rio Grande do Sul =

Municipality in Rio Grande do Sul, Brazil

Coordinates: 27°37′51″S 53°16′37″W

- Municipality
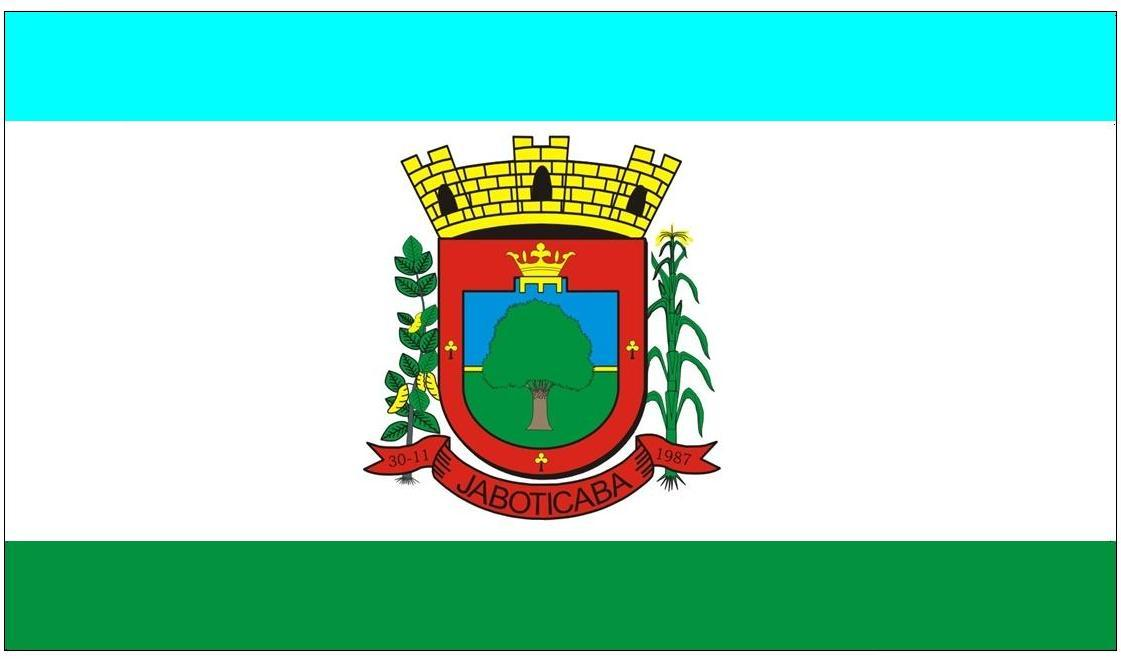
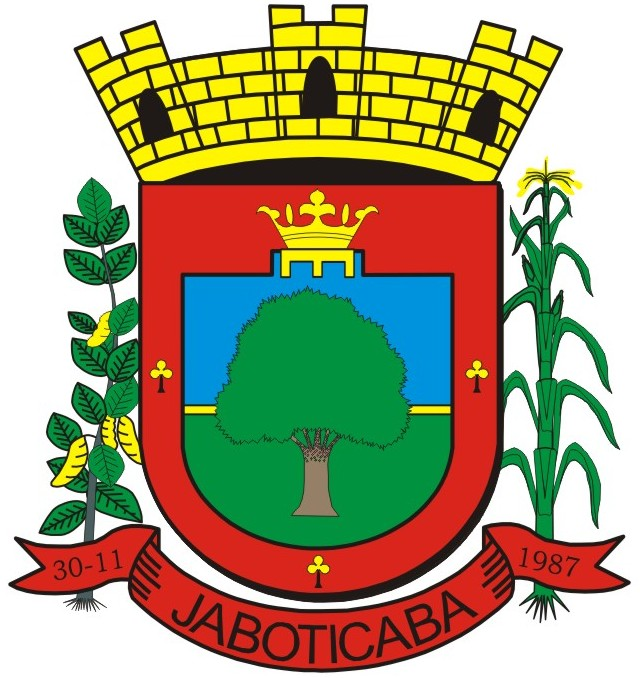
- Flag Coat of arms
- Interactive map of Jaboticaba, Rio Grande do Sul
- Country: Brazil
- Time zone: UTC−3 (BRT)

Jaboticaba is a municipality in the state of Rio Grande do Sul, Brazil. As of 2020, the estimated population was 3,773.

== See also ==
- List of municipalities in Rio Grande do Sul
