= Plinia martinellii =

Scientific classification
- Kingdom: Plantae
- Clade: Embryophytes
- Clade: Tracheophytes
- Clade: Spermatophytes
- Clade: Angiosperms
- Clade: Eudicots
- Clade: Rosids
- Order: Myrtales
- Family: Myrtaceae
- Genus: Plinia
- Species: P. martinellii

Binomial name
- Plinia martinellii G.M.Barroso & Peron

Species of plant in the myrtle family

Plinia martinellii, commonly known as jabuticabinha da mata (little forest jabuticaba), is a species of plant in the family Myrtaceae. It is endemic to the Atlantic Rainforest in the state of Rio de Janeiro, Brazil. This small tree produces dark blue-black fruits, around 20 mm (0.8 in) in diameter.
