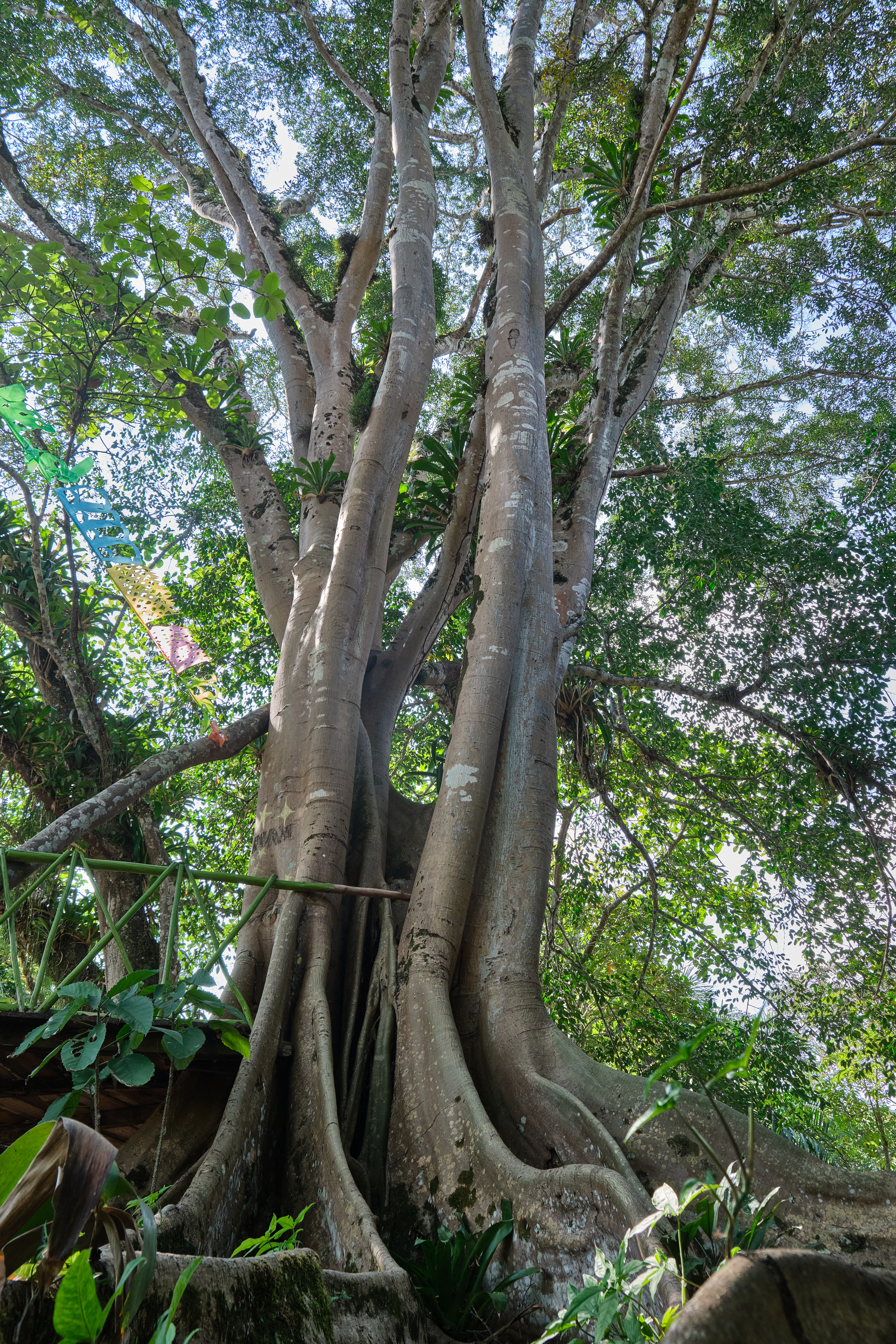

Conservation status
- Least Concern (IUCN 3.1)

Scientific classification
- Kingdom: Plantae
- Clade: Tracheophytes
- Clade: Angiosperms
- Clade: Eudicots
- Clade: Rosids
- Order: Rosales
- Family: Moraceae
- Genus: Ficus
- Species: F. gomelleira

Binomial name
- Ficus gomelleira Kunth & C.D.Bouché

Synonyms
- Urostigma gomelleira (Kunth & C.D.Bouché) Miq.; Ficus acarouaniensis Benoist; Ficus doliaria (Miq.) Mart.; Ficus fulvistipula Warb. ex Glaz.; Ficus schultesii Dugand; Urostigma doliarium Miq.

= Ficus gomelleira =

Species of flowering plant

Ficus gomelleira is a species of flowering plant, a tree in the family Moraceae. This species is monoecious.

Through the 1950s to the 1990s this species was widely viewed as the iroko tree.

The tree can have a size up to 40 m, with a diameter that can reach up to 150 cm or more.

== Names ==
The species goes by several common names. In Peru it is called Ojé Renaco, Renaco, or Ojé, while in Brazil it is called Caxinguba, Figuier, or Figueira.

== Occurrence ==
The species is native to Bolivia, Brazil, Colombia, Ecuador, Guyana, Peru, Suriname, Trinidad-Tobago, and Venezuela.
