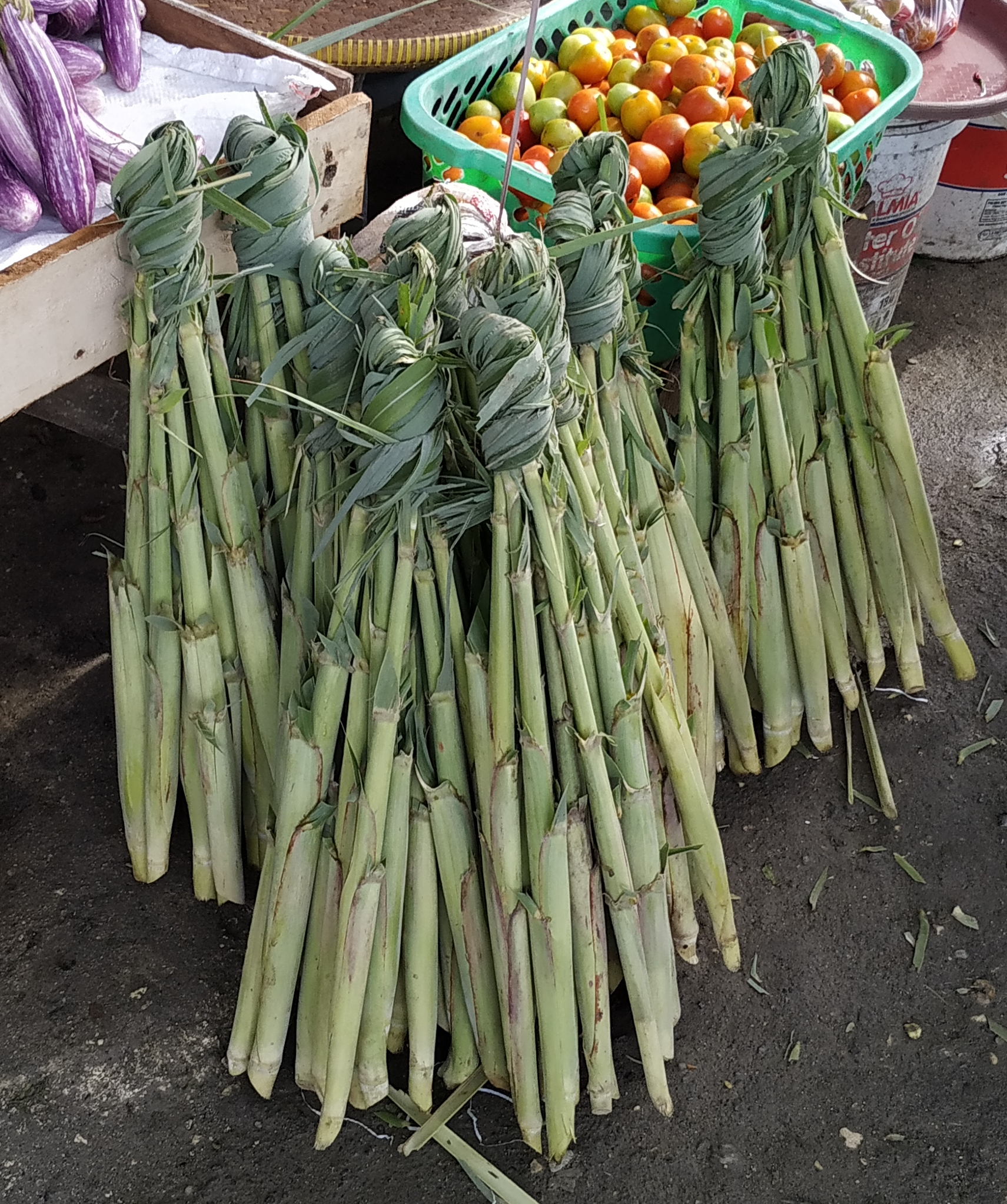
- Saccharum edule at a market in Luwuk, Banggai, Central Sulawesi

Scientific classification
- Kingdom: Plantae
- Clade: Tracheophytes
- Clade: Angiosperms
- Clade: Monocots
- Clade: Commelinids
- Order: Poales
- Family: Poaceae
- Subfamily: Panicoideae
- Genus: Saccharum
- Species: S. edule

Binomial name
- Saccharum edule Hassk.

= Saccharum edule =

Species of grass

Saccharum edule is a species of sugarcane, that is a grass in the genus Saccharum with a fibrous stalk that is rich in sugar. It is cultivated in tropical climates in southeastern Asia.

The young, unopened flower heads of Saccharum edule are eaten raw, steamed, or toasted, and prepared in various ways in Southeastern Asia, including New Guinea, Fiji and certain island communities of Indonesia.

== Description ==
Saccharum edule is a perennial plant that grows in vigorous clumps that grow to a height of 1.5 to 4 metres (4 ft 11 in to 13 ft 1 in). Although the plant resembles sugarcane from a distance, the stem is much narrower and the leaves thinner and more flexible. The large flower panicles do not open but remain inside their leaf sheaths, forming a dense mass. Saccharum edule is part of the Saccharum officinarum species complex and its genome has been investigated.

== Distribution ==
Saccharum edule originated in Southeastern Asia and is also grown on various Pacific Islands at heights ranging from sea level to high altitudes. It needs a growing temperature of 20 °C (68 °F) to 30 °C (86 °F) and an annual rainfall of 1,500 to 3,000 millimetres (59 to 118 in).

== Uses ==
The unopened flower heads of Saccharum edule are gathered and used as a vegetable; they're eaten either raw or cooked. In Fiji, a number of different varieties occur, and some grow wild along the riverbank. Children enjoy gathering, roasting, and eating the flower heads of the early season red duruka, and later the different varieties of white duruka as they mature in rotation. The flower heads are widely sold in local markets for use as a vegetable. A purple duruka, which flowers twice a year, has been introduced and become popular, and it is proposed that a canning operation be set up to sell this as "Fijian asparagus". The plant is also used for erosion control.

In Papua New Guinea, pitpit is eaten cooked in coconut milk.
