= Caralluma edulis =

Scientific classification
- Kingdom: Plantae
- Clade: Tracheophytes
- Clade: Angiosperms
- Clade: Eudicots
- Clade: Asterids
- Order: Gentianales
- Family: Apocynaceae
- Genus: Caralluma
- Species: C. edulis

Binomial name
- Caralluma edulis (Edgew.) Benth. ex Hook.f.

Species of plant

Caralluma edulis is a succulent species in the plant family Apocynaceae, native to India and Pakistan.

The leaves and stem are eaten in North Africa.
