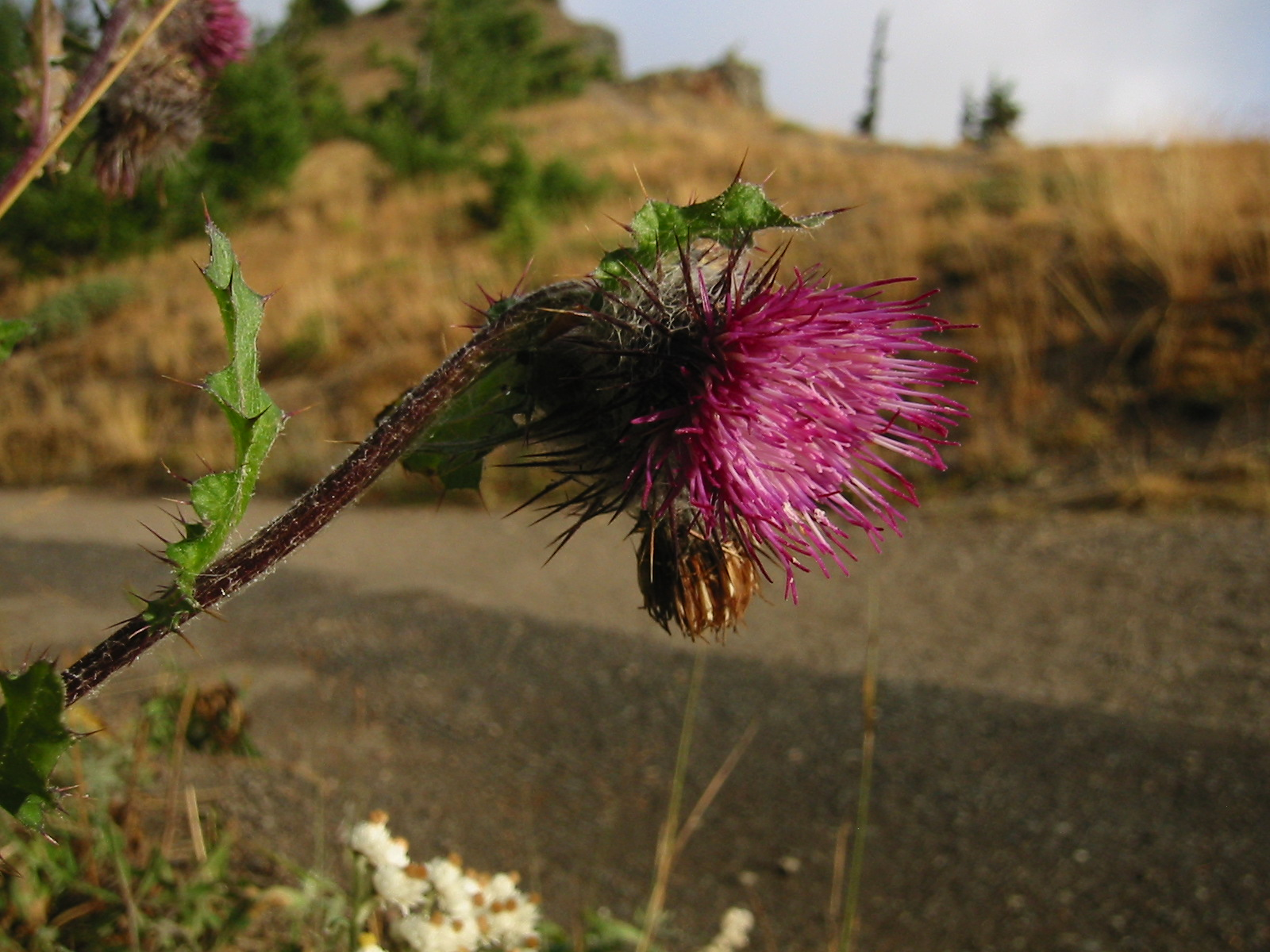

Scientific classification
- Kingdom: Plantae
- Clade: Tracheophytes
- Clade: Angiosperms
- Clade: Eudicots
- Clade: Asterids
- Order: Asterales
- Family: Asteraceae
- Genus: Cirsium
- Species: C. edule

Binomial name
- Cirsium edule Nutt.

Synonyms
- Carduus edulis (Nutt.) Greene; Carduus hallii A.Heller; Cirsium hallii (A.Gray) M.E.Jones; Cnicus edulis (Nutt.) A.Gray; Cnicus hallii A.Gray; Carduus macounii Greene; Cirsium macounii (Greene) Petr.

= Cirsium edule =

Species of thistle

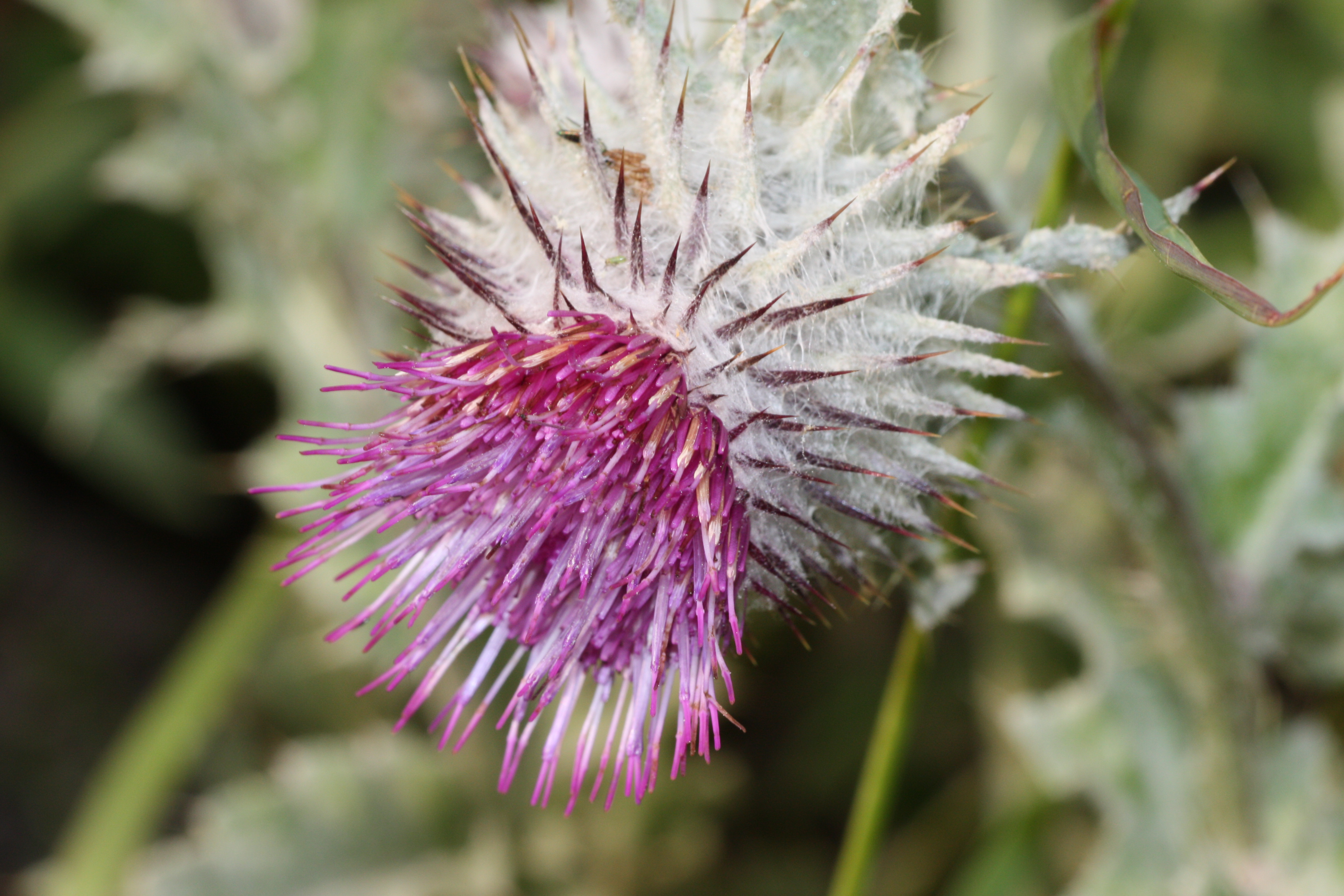
All the florets have similar form (Alpine Lakes Wilderness).

Cirsium edule, the edible thistle or Indian thistle, is a species of thistle in the genus Cirsium, native to western North America from southeastern Alaska south through British Columbia to Washington and Oregon, and locally inland to Idaho. It is a larval host to the mylitta crescent and the painted lady.

Cirsium edule is a tall herbaceous perennial plant, reaching 1–2 m (39–79 in) in height. The leaves are very spiny, lobed, 10–30 cm long and 2–5 cm broad (smaller on the upper part of the flower stem). The inflorescence is 3–4 cm diameter, purple, with numerous disc florets but no ray florets. The achenes are 4–5 mm long, with a downy pappus which assists in wind dispersal. It is monocarpic, growing as a low rosette of leaves for a number of years, then sending up the tall flowering stem in spring, with the plant dying after seed maturation.

Edible thistle is used by Native Americans for its edible roots and young shoots. The roots are sweet, but contain inulin, which gives some people digestive problems.

Varieties

- Cirsium edule var. edule - Oregon, Washington
- Cirsium edule var. macounii (Greene) D.J.Keil - Oregon, Washington, British Columbia, Alaska
- Cirsium edule var. edule wenatchense D.J.Keil - Washington
