= Coleus maculosus subsp. edulis =

Scientific classification
- Kingdom: Plantae
- Clade: Tracheophytes
- Clade: Angiosperms
- Clade: Eudicots
- Clade: Asterids
- Order: Lamiales
- Family: Lamiaceae
- Genus: Coleus
- Species: C. maculosus
- Subspecies: C. m. subsp. edulis

Trinomial name
- Coleus maculosus subsp. edulis (Vatke) A.J.Paton

Synonyms
- Coleus aquaticus Gürke; Coleus clivicola S.Moore; Coleus edulis Vatke; Coleus fimbriatus Lebrun & L.Touss.; Coleus palustris Vatke; Coleus rivularis Vatke; Coleus tuberosus A.Rich., nom. illeg., non C. tuberosus (Blume) Benth.; Majana richardiana Kuntze, nom. illeg.; Plectranthus edulis (Vatke) Agnew; Plectranthus fimbriatus (Lebrun & L.Touss.) Troupin & Ayob.; Plectranthus punctatus subsp. edulis (Vatke) A.J.Paton

Subspecies of flowering plant

Coleus maculosus subsp. edulis, synonym Plectranthus edulis, the Ethiopian potato, known as wolayta dinich or oromo dinich in Amharic, is a species of perennial plant in the family Lamiaceae. Indigenous to Ethiopia, it is grown for its edible tubers, which are cooked before they are eaten.

== See also ==
- Ethiopian cuisine
- Stachys affinis
