= Carira =

Municipality in Sergipe, Brazil

Carira Município de Carira
- Municipality
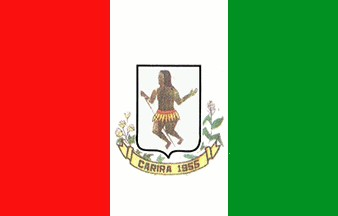
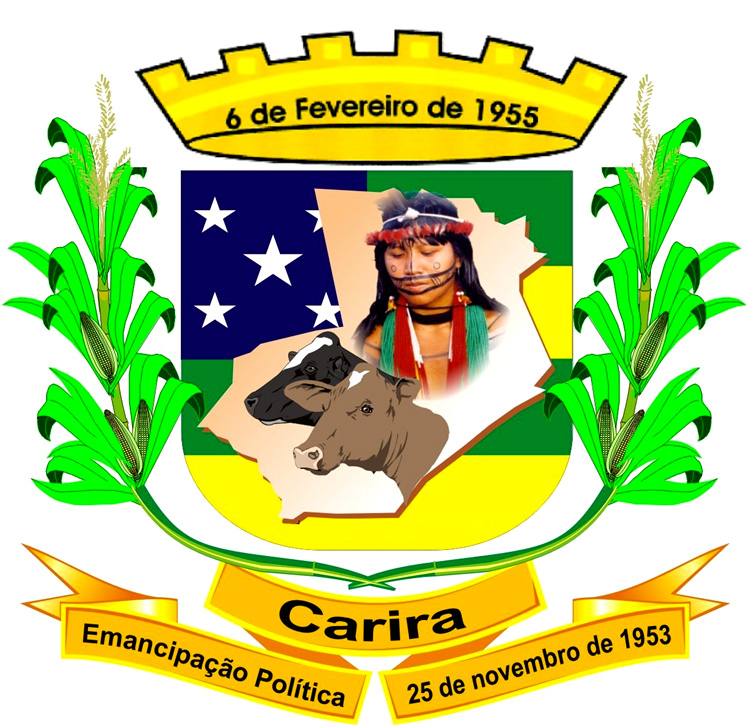
- Flag Coat of arms

- Location of Carira in Sergipe

- Location of Carira in Brazil
- Coordinates: 10°21′39″S 37°42′03″W
- Country: Brazil
- Region: Northeast
- State: Sergipe
- Founded: 1953

Government
  - Mayor: Diogo Menezes Machado

Area
  - Total: 636.5 km^{2} (245.8 sq mi)
- Elevation: 351 m (1,152 ft)

Population (2020)
  - Total: 22,239
  - Density: 34.94/km^{2} (90.49/sq mi)
- Demonym: Carirense
- Time zone: UTC−3 (BRT)
- Website: carira.se.gov.br

Carira (Brazilian Portuguese: [kaˈɾiɾɐ]) is a municipality located in the Brazilian state of Sergipe. Its population was 22,239 (2020) and its area is 636.5 km^{2} (245.8 mi^{2}). Carira has a population density of 34 inhabitants per square kilometer. Carira is located 112 km (70 mi) from the state capital of Sergipe, Aracaju.

== See also ==
- List of municipalities in Sergipe
