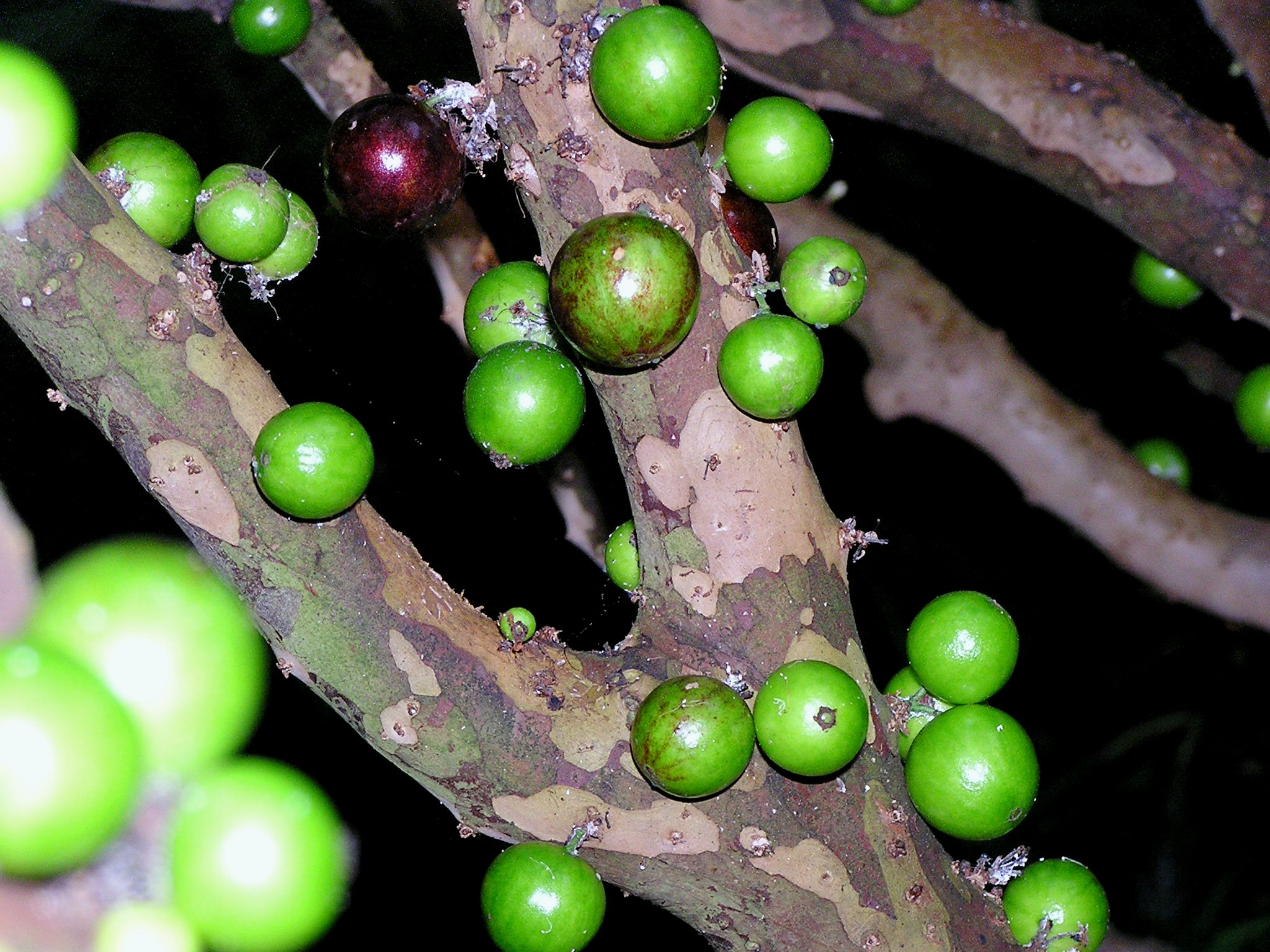

Scientific classification
- Kingdom: Plantae
- Clade: Embryophytes
- Clade: Tracheophytes
- Clade: Spermatophytes
- Clade: Angiosperms
- Clade: Eudicots
- Clade: Rosids
- Order: Myrtales
- Family: Myrtaceae
- Genus: Plinia
- Species: P. peruviana

Binomial name
- Plinia peruviana (Poir.) Govaerts

Synonyms
- Eugenia cauliflora Miq. [Illegitimate]; Eugenia guapurium DC. [Illegitimate]; Eugenia rabeniana Kiaersk.; Guapurium fruticosum Spreng.; Guapurium peruvianum Poir.; Myrciaria guapurium (DC.) O.Berg [Illegitimate]; Myrciaria peruviana (Poir.) Mattos; Myrciaria peruviana var. trunciflora (O.Berg) Mattos; Myrciaria trunciflora O.Berg; Plinia trunciflora (O.Berg) Kausel

= Plinia peruviana =

Species of plant in the myrtle family

Plinia peruviana, commonly known as jabuticaba cabinho (small stemmed jabuticaba) in Brazil, is a species of plant in the family Myrtaceae. It is endemic to central South America.

== Description ==
Plinia peruviana is a tree that grows to between 4 and 14 metres (13 and 46 ft) tall, and is usually found in mixed araucaria forests, on alluvial plains and in open forest. It produces edible fruit, between 18 and 25 mm (0.71 and 0.98 in) in diameter, which is dark-purple in colour. Unlike other Jabuticabas, the fruits of Plinia peruviana are connected to the tree by long stems, resembling cherries.

== Uses ==
Fruits can be eaten fresh or made into jelly, juice, wine or liqueur. Research has shown that the fruit has potential uses as a dye, flavoring or antioxidant.

Studies have found that the jaboticaba fruit can serve as a wound healing agent on L929 fibroblasts cell line, likely due to its antioxidant activity. Jaboticaba has been used as a traditional natural medicine to treat skin irritations, diarrhea, etc.

It has also been found that extracts of the jaboticaba's peel can enrich cows milk with phenolic compounds. Phenolic compounds contain many antioxidants and are a natural part of the human diet. Enrichment of human consumed cow milk may aid in delivering antioxidants to the general population.

Extract from the fruit peel has been shown to be antifungal and protect against copper toxicity.
