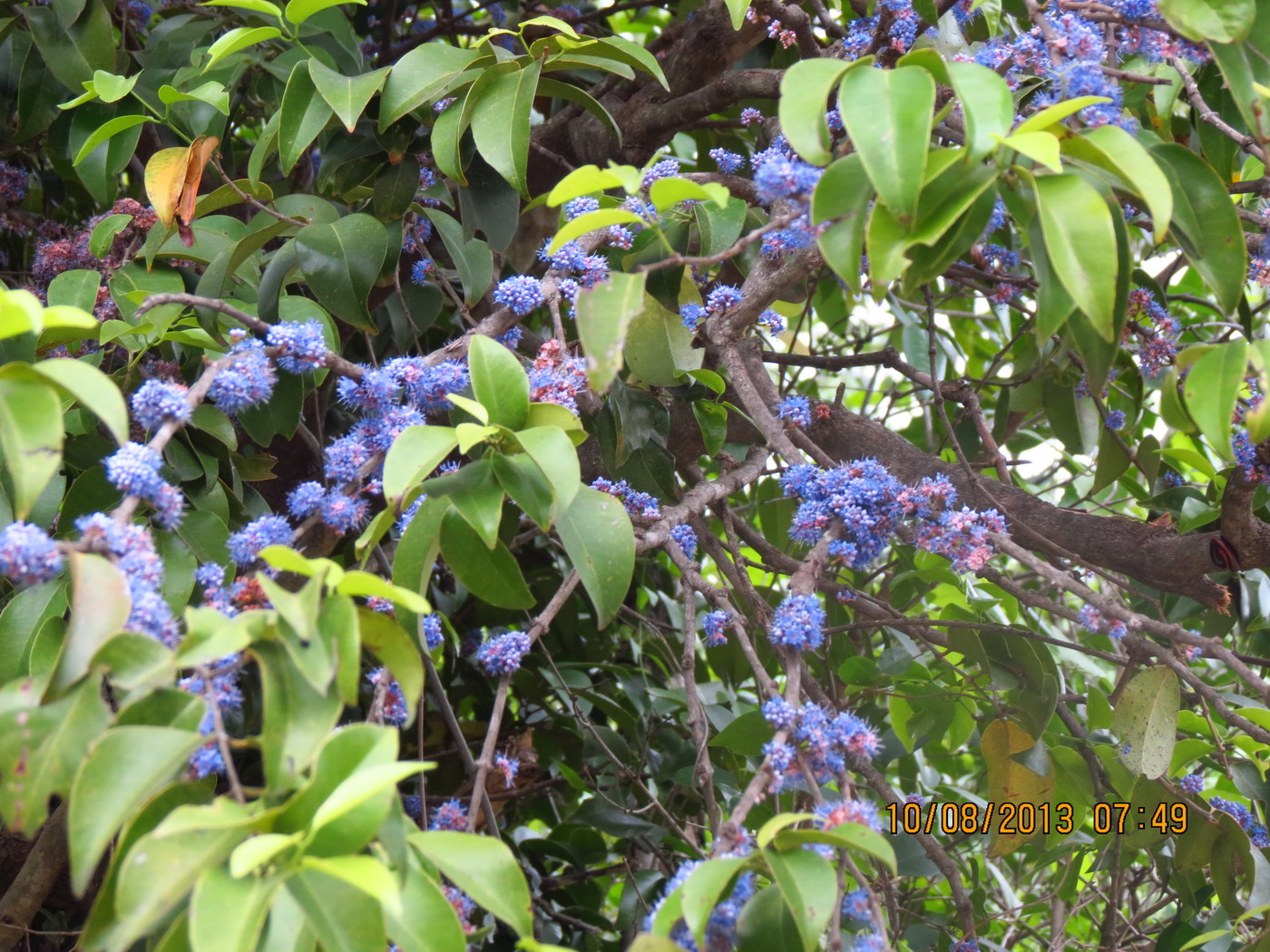

Scientific classification
- Kingdom: Plantae
- Clade: Tracheophytes
- Clade: Angiosperms
- Clade: Eudicots
- Clade: Rosids
- Order: Myrtales
- Family: Melastomataceae
- Genus: Memecylon
- Species: M. edule

Binomial name
- Memecylon edule Roxb.

= Memecylon edule =

Species of tree

Memecylon edule is a small evergreen tree native to India especially the Deccan Plateau including most of Karnataka, Andhra Pradesh and parts of Tamil Nadu, Thailand, Malay Peninsula, Singapore and Borneo. It is found in shores with sand or rocky soils. Common names include kaayam, delek bangas, delek air, nipis kulit ("thin-skinned" in Malay), miat, and nemaaru.

== Description ==
=== Tree ===
The tree is small and grows between 3–7 metres tall; it has a thin, greyish brown bark. The leaves are ovate 3–7 centimetres long, each of its surface is very thick and leathery that the veins are hard to see.

=== Flowers and fruit ===
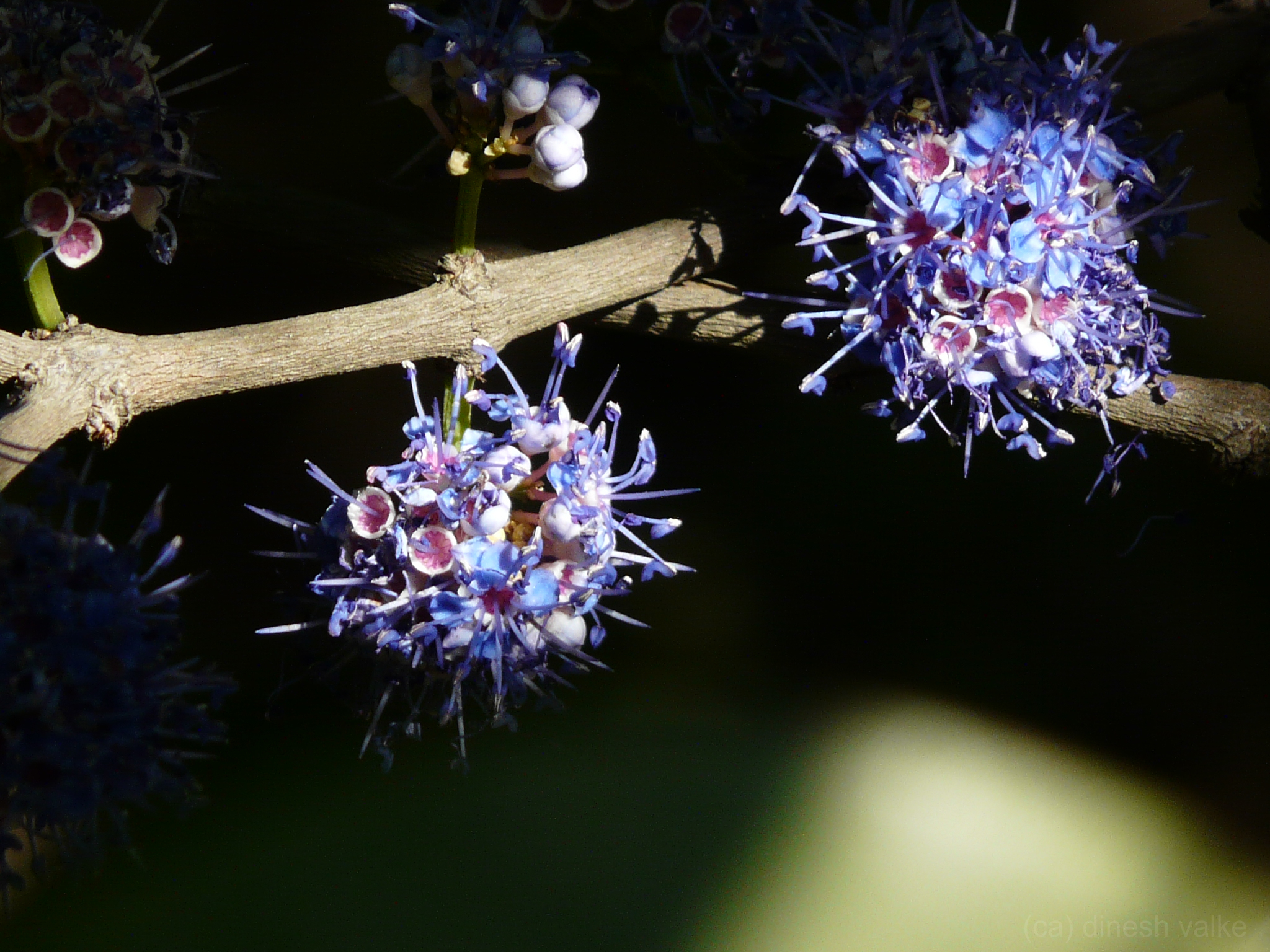
M. edule flowers.

The tree blooms once or twice per year. These flowers are arranged in a spiky, spherical inflorescence that people compare to the shape of a coronavirus. Each blossom is a regular hermaphrodite with petals as many as calyx lobes inserted on the mouth of its limb, its stamens are shorter in the alternate and may be seriate. As the flower petals are shed, the sand and rocks below are dusted in mauve.

The fruit is a fleshy capsule or berry with about a centimeter long, it appears green, turning red or pink, then yellow, and later black as it ripens.

== Chemistry ==
The leaves contain glucosides, resins, colouring pigments, gums, starches, and malic acid. They are rich in Aluminium.

== Uses ==
This tree is valued as an ornamental and a source of wood for construction. The twigs can be taken and rubbed its ends as a natural toothbrush.

Yellow colour dye can be extracted from the leaves and flowers, the dye is used to colour the robes of Buddhist monks. Leaves and roots are used as a medicine for dysentery and as an astringent.
