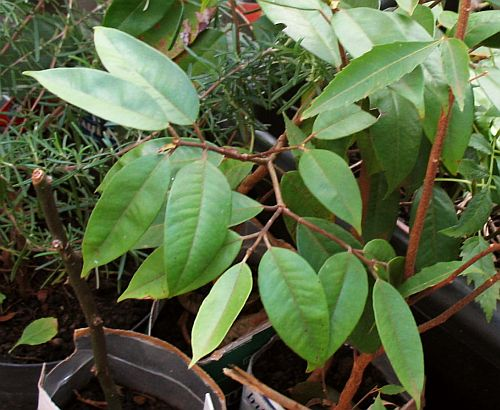

Conservation status
- Vulnerable (IUCN 3.1)

Scientific classification
- Kingdom: Plantae
- Clade: Tracheophytes
- Clade: Angiosperms
- Clade: Eudicots
- Clade: Rosids
- Order: Myrtales
- Family: Myrtaceae
- Genus: Plinia
- Species: P. edulis

Binomial name
- Plinia edulis (Vell.) Sobral

Synonyms
- Eugenia edulis Vell.; Marlierea edulis Nied.; Myrciaria edulis (Vell.) Skeels; Myrciaria plicatocostata O.Berg [Illegitimate]; Plinia plicatocostata (O.Berg) Amshoff [Illegitimate]; Rubachia glomerata O.Berg

= Plinia edulis =

Species of tree in the myrtle family

Plinia edulis (formerly Marlierea edulis) is a tree that grows wild in Brazil in the coastal rainforest regions around the Brazilian cities of São Paulo and Rio de Janeiro. The fruit's local name is cambucá while the tree is cambucazeiro.

The name is derived from an indigenous word for jar, cambuci, due to the tree's fruit resembling a type of water container, which some would say is "flying saucer"-shaped.

The fruit's coloration is yellowy-green, size is 6 cm in diameter and taste is sweet-sour. Cambuca fruit taste resemble light combination of mango and papaya. A member of the myrtle and eucalyptus family, the tree can grow to a height of thirty feet, and propagation is by seed.

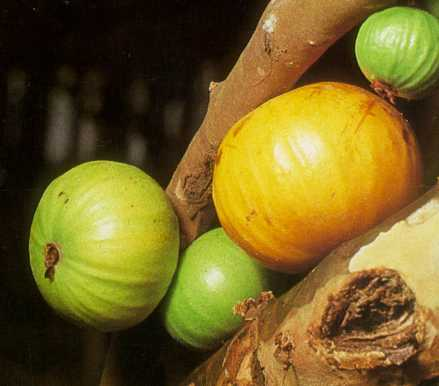
Cambuca fruits
