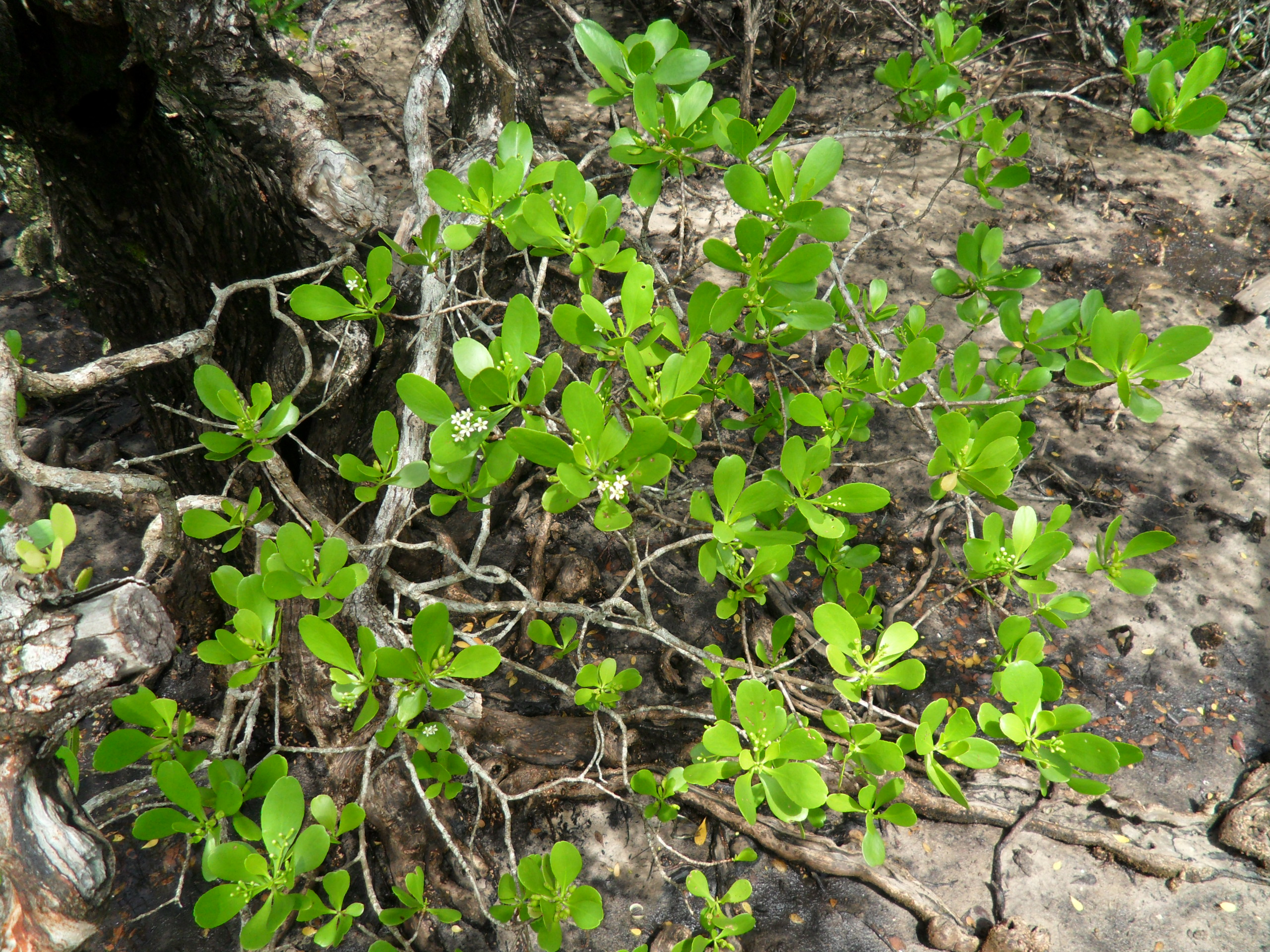
- Lumnitzera racemosa (flowering) - Kung Krabaen, Chantaburi province, Thailand

Scientific classification
- Kingdom: Plantae
- Clade: Tracheophytes
- Clade: Angiosperms
- Clade: Eudicots
- Clade: Rosids
- Order: Myrtales
- Family: Combretaceae
- Genus: Lumnitzera; Willd. (1803)
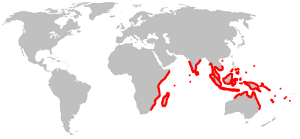
- Range of Lumnitzera

Synonyms
- Bruguiera Thouars; Funckia Dennst.; Petaloma Roxb.; Pokornya Montrouz.; Problastes Reinw.; Pyrrhanthus Jack

= Lumnitzera =

Genus of trees

Lumnitzera is an Indo-West Pacific mangrove genus in the family Combretaceae. An English common name is black mangrove. (However, "black mangrove" may also refer to the unrelated genus Avicennia.) Lumnitzera, named after the German botanist, Stephan Lumnitzer (1750-1806), occurs in mangroves from East Africa to the Western Pacific (including Fiji and Tonga), and northern Australia.

The genus has two species of similar vegetative appearance but with differing flower colour. Lumnitzera littorea has red flowers whereas Lumnitzera racemosa has white flowers. Both species have flat and spoon-shaped (spathulate) leaves with emarginate tips. L. racemosa dominates in the western part of the range and L. littorea dominates in the east. Hybrids occur within the zone of overlap (Lumnitzera × rosea).

Three genera of the tropical woody family Combretaceae, Laguncularia, Conocarpus, and Lumnitzera, are found in mangroves but Lumnitzera is the only one to occur in the Indo-West Pacific mangroves, including Australia.

== List of species ==
Current accepted species are:

- Lumnitzera littorea (Jack) Voigt
- Lumnitzera racemosa Willd.
- Lumnitzera × rosea C.Presl
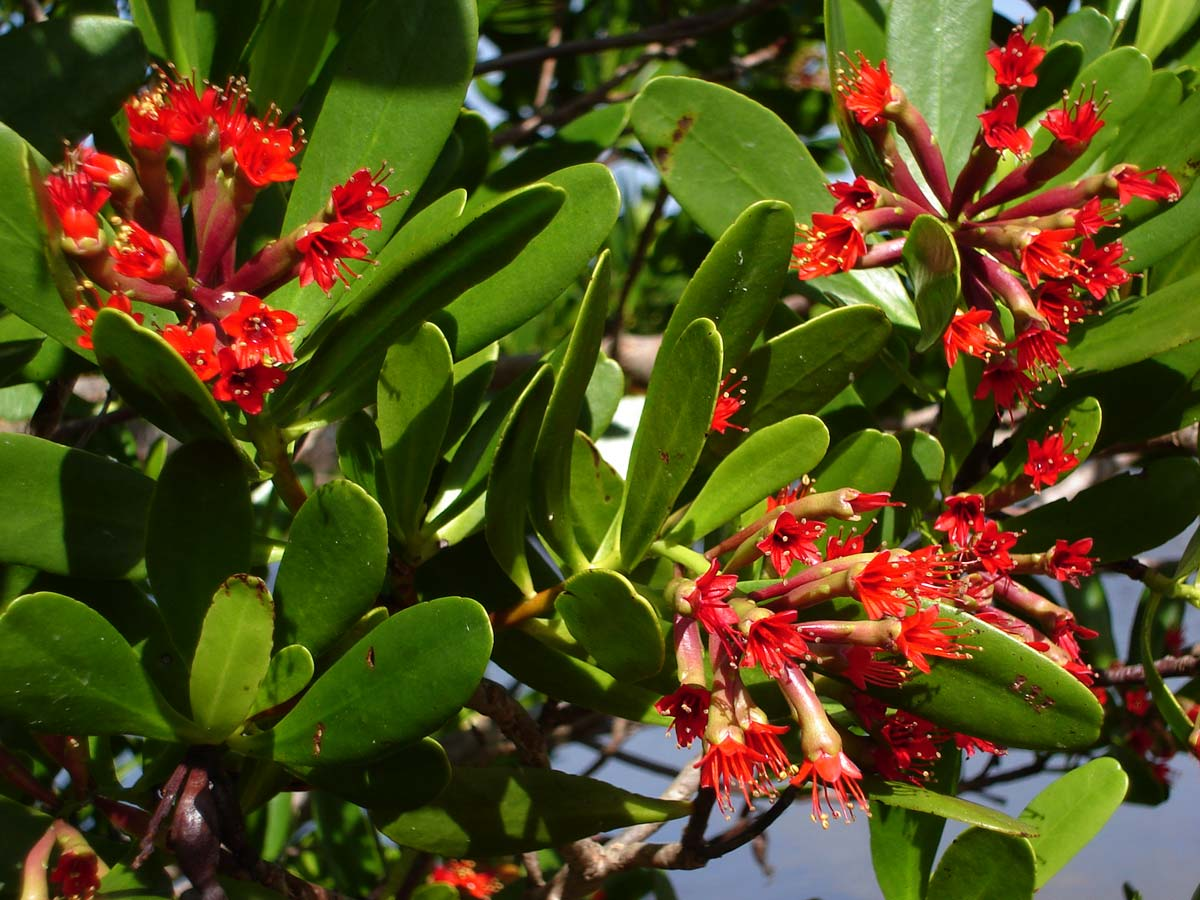
Lumnitzera littorea, Tonga

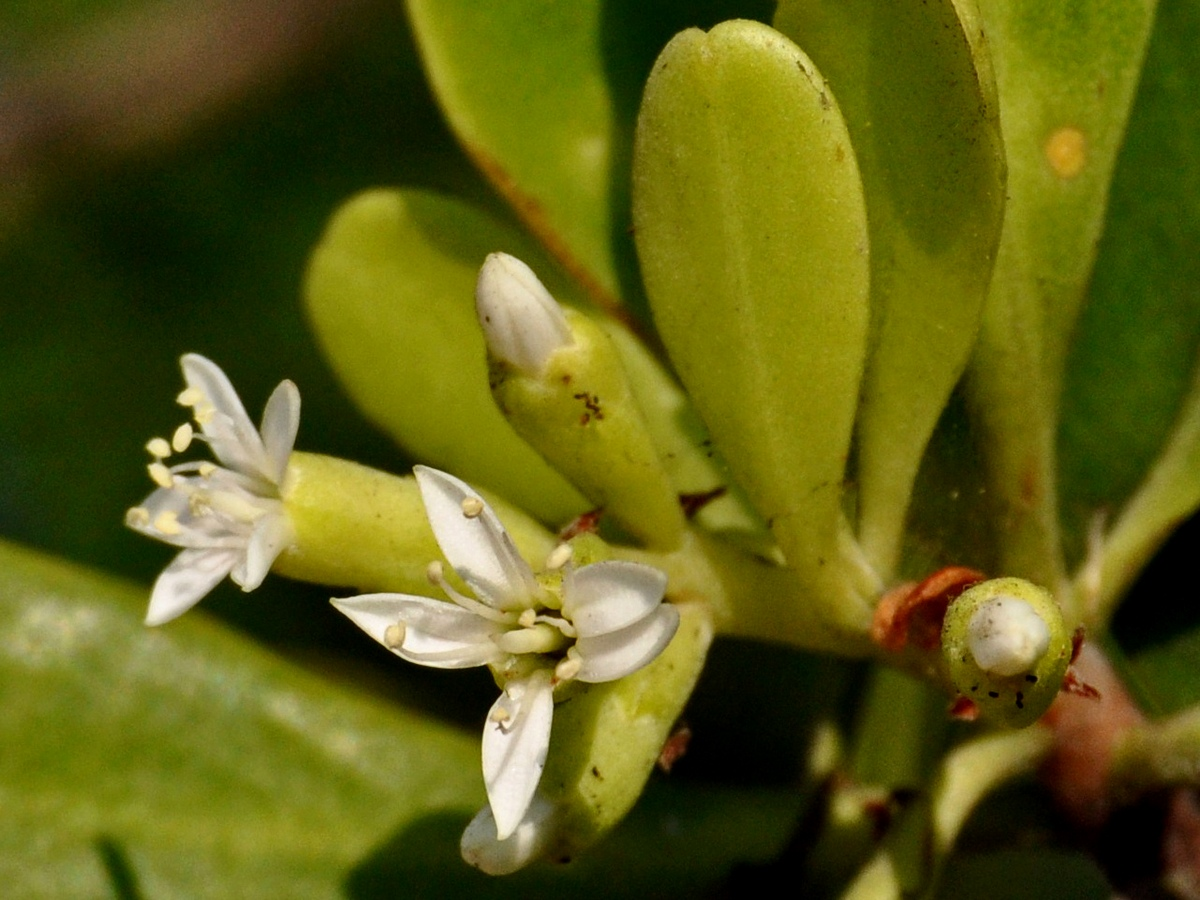
Lumnitzera racemosa, Indonesia

There have been a number of taxa that possessed the Lumnitzera genus that are now unplaced or assigned to other taxa:

- Lumnitzera caesia Spreng., unplaced
- Lumnitzera capitata (Roth) Spreng., synonym of Platostoma hispidum (L.) A.J.Paton
- Lumnitzera carnosa Spreng., synonym of Ocimum carnosum (Spreng.) Link & Otto ex Benth.
- Lumnitzera coccinea Wight & Arn., synonym of Lumnitzera littorea (Jack) Voigt
- Lumnitzera densiflora (Roth) Spreng., synonym of Isodon rugosus (Wall. ex Benth.) Codd
- Lumnitzera fastigiata (Roth) Spreng., synonym of Salvia plebeia R.Br.
- Lumnitzera lutea C.Presl, synonym of Lumnitzera racemosa var. lutea (Gaudich.) Exell
- Lumnitzera montana F.Muell., synonym of Macropteranthes montana (F.Muell.) F.Muell. ex Benth.
- Lumnitzera moschata (R.Br.) Spreng., synonym of Basilicum polystachyon (L.) Moench
- Lumnitzera pedicellata C.Presl, synonym of Lumnitzera littorea (Jack) Voigt
- Lumnitzera pentandra Griff., synonym of Lumnitzera littorea (Jack) Voigt
- Lumnitzera polystachyon (L.) J.Jacq. ex Spreng., synonym of Basilicum polystachyon (L.) Moench
- Lumnitzera prostrata (L.) Spreng., synonym of Platostoma menthoides (L.) A.J.Paton
- Lumnitzera purpurea (Gaudich.) C. Presl, synonym of Lumnitzera littorea (Jack) Voigt
- Lumnitzera rubicunda (D.Don) Spreng., synonym of Orthosiphon rubicundus (D.Don) Benth.
- Lumnitzera salvioides (B.Heyne ex Roth) Spreng., synonym of Plectranthus salvioides (B.Heyne ex Roth) Benth.
- Lumnitzera tenuiflora (L.) Spreng., synonym of Ocimum tenuiflorum L.
- Lumnitzera virgata (D.Don) Spreng., synonym of Orthosiphon rubicundus var. rubicundus
