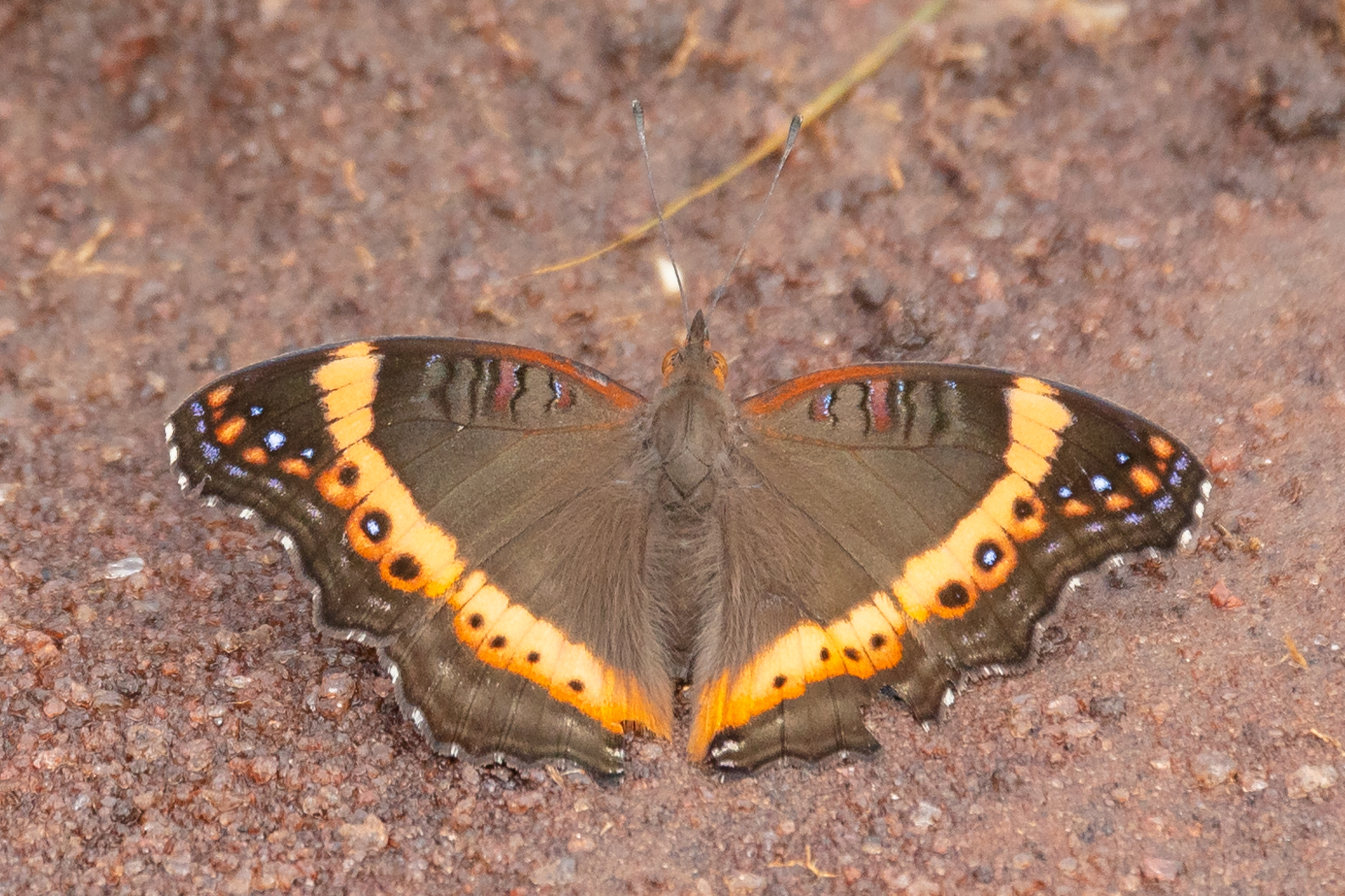
- f. pelasgis in Tanzania, East Africa
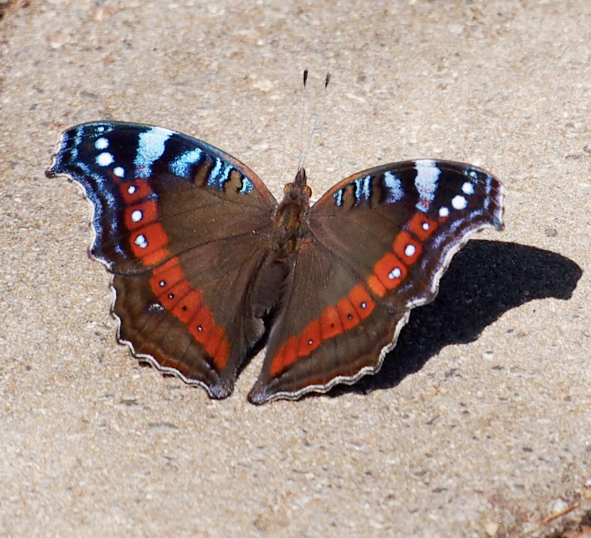
- f. archesia in South Africa

Scientific classification
- Kingdom: Animalia
- Phylum: Arthropoda
- Clade: Pancrustacea
- Class: Insecta
- Order: Lepidoptera
- Family: Nymphalidae
- Genus: Precis
- Species: P. archesia

Binomial name
- Precis archesia (Cramer, [1779])

Synonyms
- Papilio archesia Cramer, 1779; Junonia archesia; Vanessa pelasgis Godart, 1819; Junonia chapunga Hewitson, 1864; Precis staudingeri Dewitz, 1879; Precis guruana Rogenhofer, 1891; Precis archesia var. semitypica Aurivillius, 1899; Precis archesia var. striata Aurivillius, 1901; Precis archesia ab. inornata Neustetter, 1916; Precis archesia f. coryndoni Rothschild, 1918; Precis archesia f. obsoleta Joicey and Talbot, 1921; Junonia archesia ugandensis McLeod, 1980

= Precis archesia =

Garden inspector

Species of butterfly

Precis archesia, the garden inspector or garden commodore, is a species of butterfly in the family Nymphalidae, native to Subsaharan Africa.

Wingspan: 45–50 mm for males and 50–60 mm for females.

Flight period is year-round with two main broods from September to March and April to August.

== Subspecies ==
- P. a. archesia — Kenya, Tanzania, southern Democratic Republic of the Congo, Angola, Zambia to Zimbabwe, Botswana, Eswatini, South Africa: Limpopo Province, Mpumalanga, North West Province, Gauteng, KwaZulu-Natal, Eastern Cape Province, Western Cape Province to the south-east
- P. a. ugandensis (McLeod, 1980) — Sudan, Uganda

== Diet ==
Larval food plants include Plectranthus esculentus, Plectranthus fruticosus, Rabdosiella calycina, Pycnostachys reticulata, and Pycnostachys urticifolia.

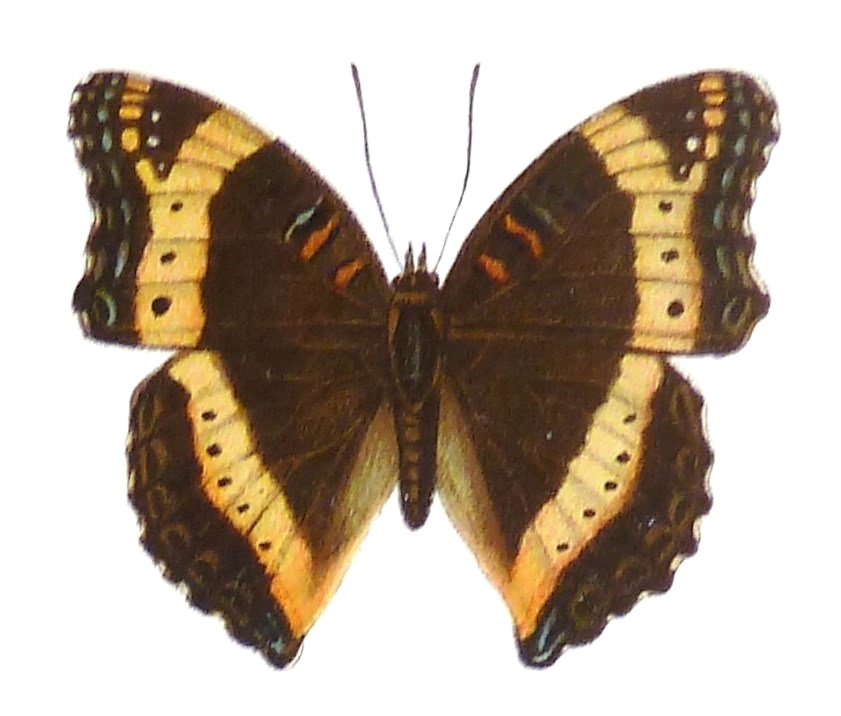
Precis archesia f. pelasgis, illustrated in Seitz (1910)

P. archesia f. archesia female (rounder wings than male) in Seitz (1910)

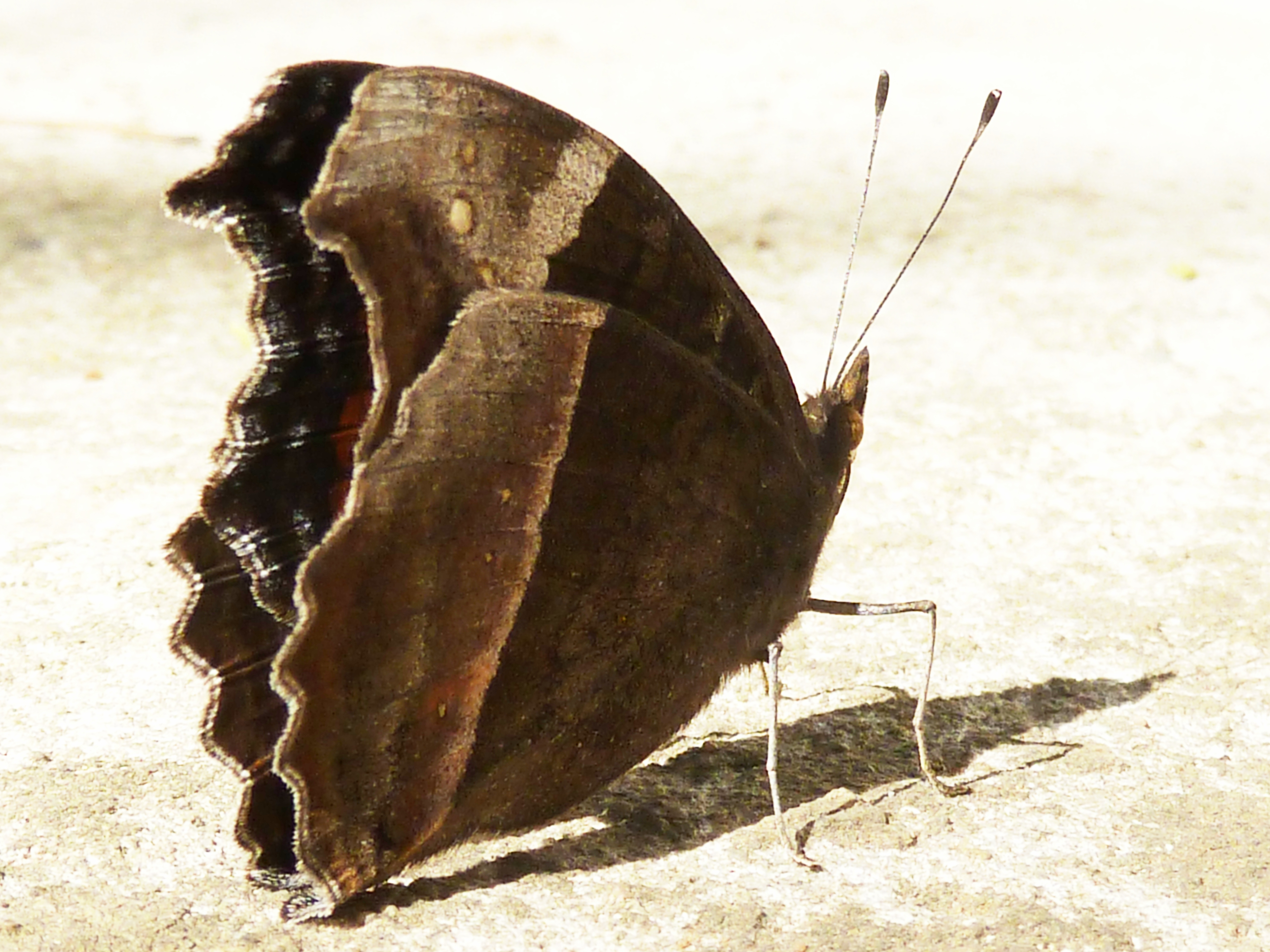
Underside of wings, f. archesia
