= Acrocephalus =

Acrocephalus may refer to:

- Acrocephalus (bird), a bird genus in the family Acrocephalidae
- Acrocephalus (plant), a plant genus in the family Lamiaceae
