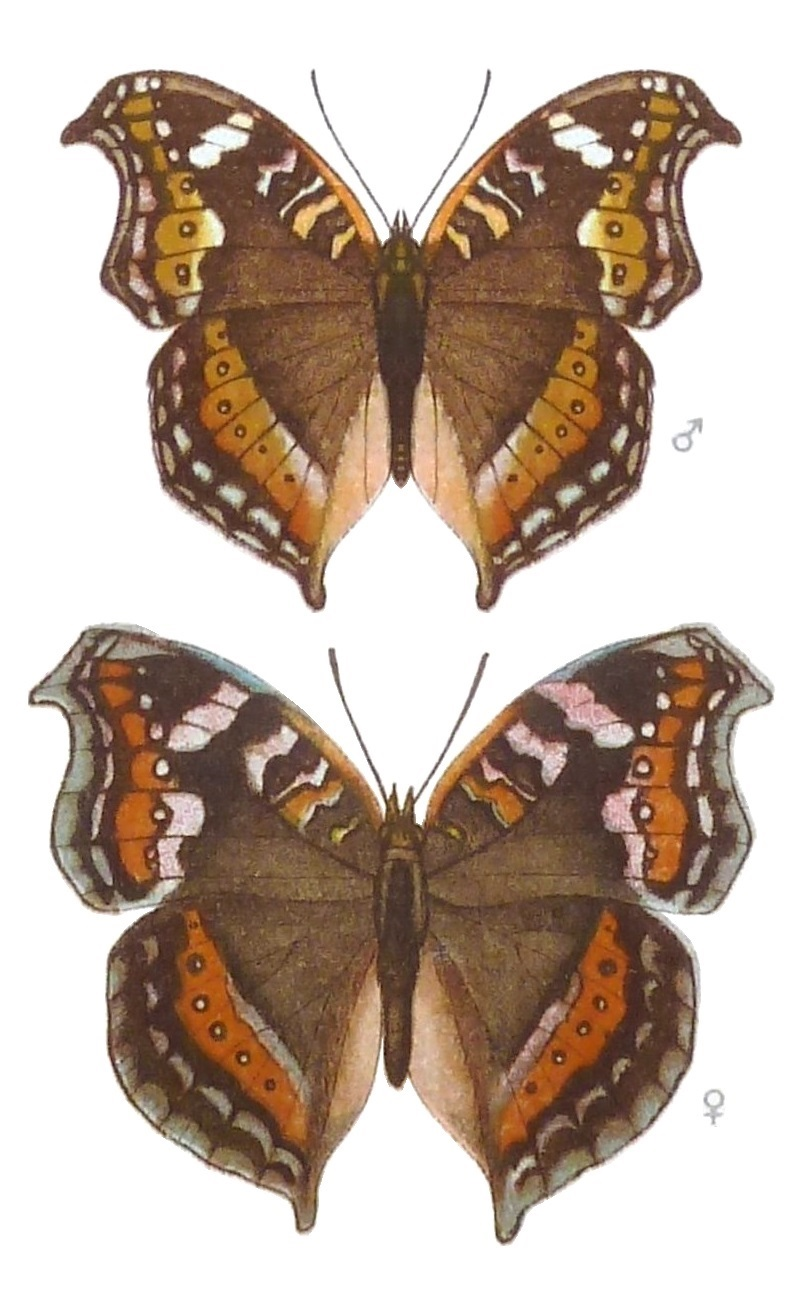
- male and female

Scientific classification
- Domain: Eukaryota
- Kingdom: Animalia
- Phylum: Arthropoda
- Class: Insecta
- Order: Lepidoptera
- Family: Nymphalidae
- Genus: Precis
- Species: P. actia

Binomial name
- Precis actia Distant, 1880

Synonyms
- Precis vetula Staudinger, 1885; Precis pelarga f. furcata Rothschild and Jordan, 1903; Precis pelarga albofasciata Suffert, 1904; Precis actia rubrofasciata Suffert, 1904

= Precis actia =

Air commodore

Species of butterfly

Precis actia, the air commodore, is a butterfly in the family Nymphalidae. It is found in Angola, the southern part of the Democratic Republic of the Congo, Uganda, Rwanda, Burundi, Kenya, Tanzania, Malawi, northern Zambia, Zimbabwe, and western Mozambique. The habitat consists of Brachystegia woodland and savanna.

Both sexes are attracted to flowers and males also engage in mud-puddling.

The larvae feed on Platostoma species.
