= Penicillium sumatrense =

Scientific classification
- Domain: Eukaryota
- Kingdom: Fungi
- Division: Ascomycota
- Class: Eurotiomycetes
- Order: Eurotiales
- Family: Aspergillaceae
- Genus: Penicillium
- Species: P. sumatrense

Binomial name
- Penicillium sumatrense Svilv.

Type strain
- CBS 281.36

Species of fungus

Penicillium sumatrense is a species of fungus in the genus Penicillium which was isolated from the rhizosphere of the plant Lumnitzera racemosa. Penicillium sumatrense produces sumalarin A, sumalarin B, sumalarin C
