= Nosema =

Nosema may refer to:

- Nosema (microsporidian), a fungus genus in the division Microsporidia
- Nosema (plant), a plant genus in the family Lamiaceae
