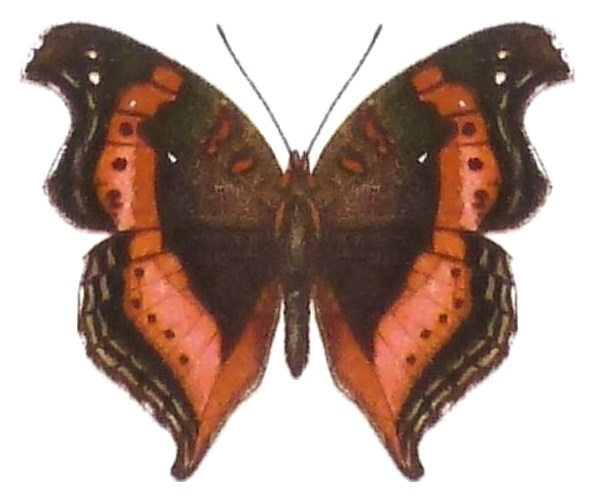
- In Adalbert Seitz's Fauna Africana

Scientific classification
- Domain: Eukaryota
- Kingdom: Animalia
- Phylum: Arthropoda
- Class: Insecta
- Order: Lepidoptera
- Family: Nymphalidae
- Genus: Precis
- Species: P. sinuata

Binomial name
- Precis sinuata Plötz, 1880

Synonyms
- Precis serena Weymer, 1892; Precis sinuata var. pelargoides Aurivillius, 1891; Precis milonia sinuata ab. parvipunctis Strand, 1910

= Precis sinuata =

Wide-banded commodore

Species of butterfly

Precis sinuata, the wide-banded commodore, is a butterfly in the family Nymphalidae. It is found in Guinea, Sierra Leone, Liberia, Ivory Coast, Ghana, Nigeria, Cameroon, Equatorial Guinea, São Tomé and Príncipe, the Republic of the Congo, the Central African Republic, the Democratic Republic of the Congo, Uganda, Rwanda, Burundi, Kenya, Tanzania, Malawi, Zambia and Mozambique. The habitat consists of forests and woodland.

The larvae feed on Platostoma species.

== Subspecies ==
- Precis sinuata sinuata — Guinea, Sierra Leone, Liberia, Ivory Coast, Ghana, Nigeria, Cameroon, São Tomé Island, Congo, Central African Republic, Democratic Republic of the Congo, Burundi, Tanzania, northern Malawi, Zambia, Mozambique
- Precis sinuata hecqui Berger, 1981 — Democratic Republic of the Congo: Kivu, western Uganda, Rwanda, western Kenya, north-western Tanzania
