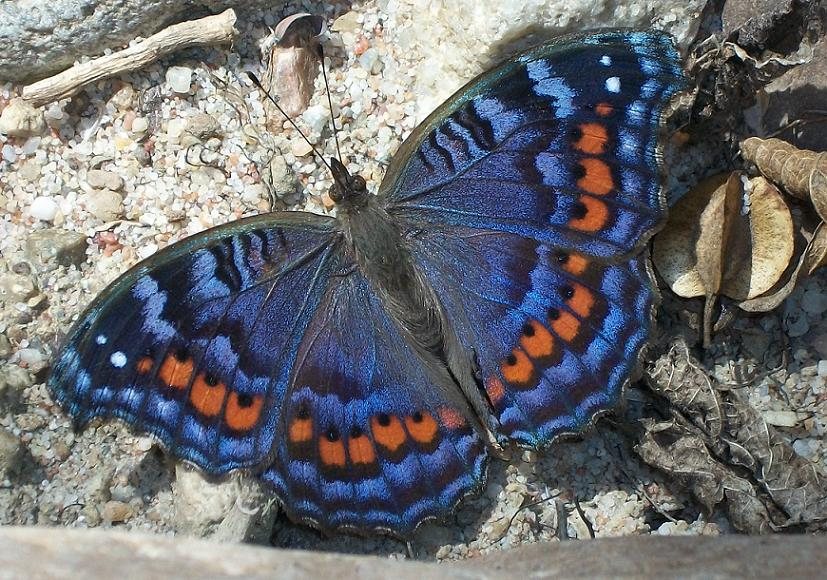
- Winter form of P. o. sesamus
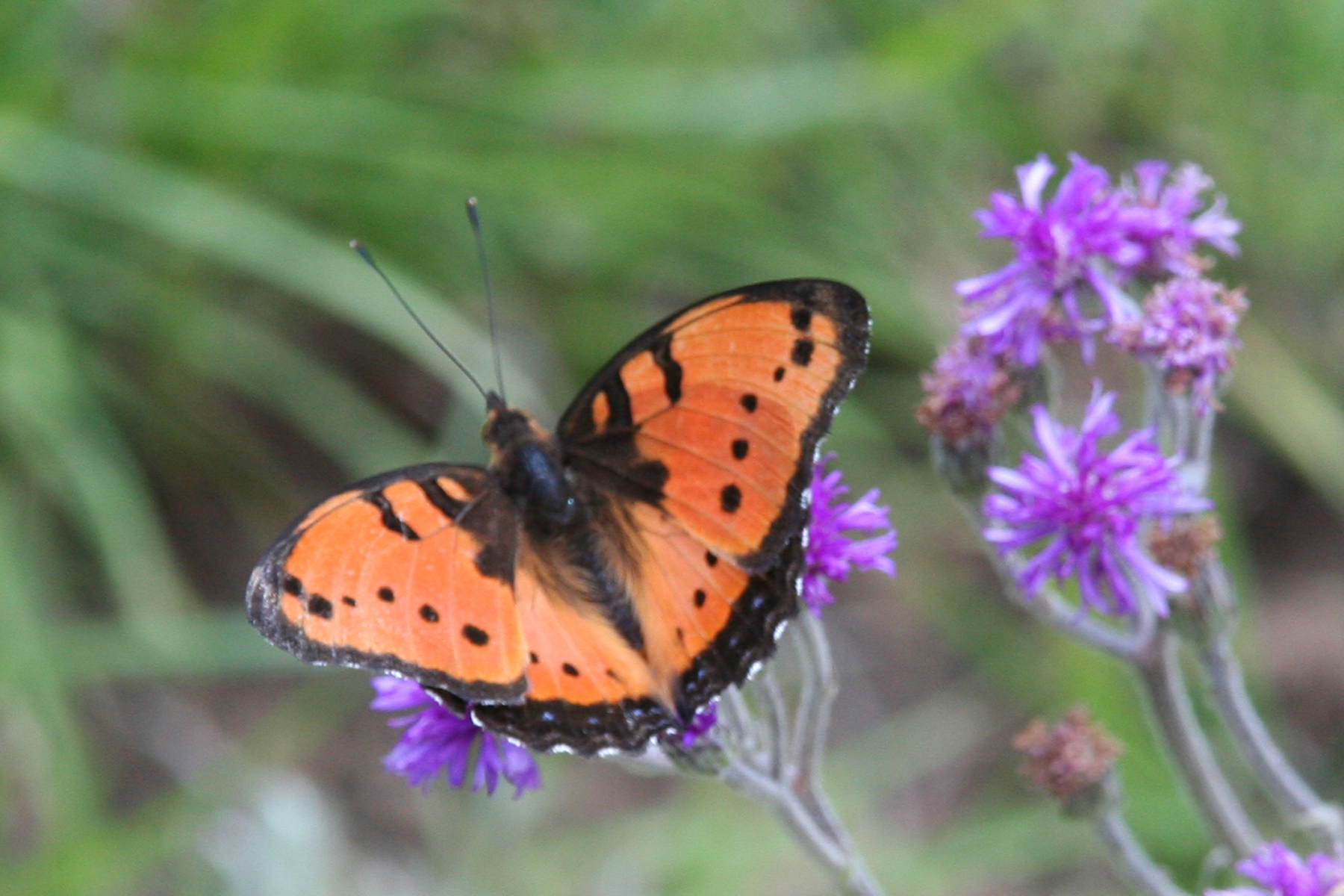
- Summer form of P. o. sesamus

Scientific classification
- Kingdom: Animalia
- Phylum: Arthropoda
- Clade: Pancrustacea
- Class: Insecta
- Order: Lepidoptera
- Family: Nymphalidae
- Genus: Precis
- Species: P. octavia

Binomial name
- Precis octavia (Cramer, 1777)

Synonyms
- Papilio octavia Cramer, 1777; Junonia octavia octavia; Precis sesamus (Trimen, 1883); Junonia octavia sesamus; Papilio amestris Drury, 1782; Papilio zingha Fabricius, 1787; Vanessa emma Godart, 1819; Precis amestris f. intermedia Wichgraf, 1918; Precis octavia ab. kuala Heslop, 1959; Precis octavia var. natalensis Staudinger, 1885; Junonia calescens Butler, 1894; Precis octavia f. transiens Wichgraf, 1918

= Precis octavia =

Gaudy commodore

Species of butterfly

Precis octavia, the gaudy commodore, is a species of butterfly in the family Nymphalidae. It is native to Africa.

== Description ==
Precis octavia was first described by Pieter Cramer in 1777. The nominate subspecies (Precis octavia octavia) flies from West Africa, through Cameroon, Gabon, Republic of Central Africa, Republic of the Congo, Democratic Republic of the Congo, north to Sudan, Ethiopia, Somalia, and Zimbabwe. It has a wet season form—orange with a pinkish flush and black markings on the upperside—and a dry season form—shining blue with a vivid red band on the hindwing. In his authoritative 2-vol. book "Butterflies of West Africa", Torben B. Larsen states "I believe this species has the most spectacular seasonal dimorphism of any butterfly, and the two morphs were [first] described as distinct species."

The southern subspecies (Precis octavia sesamus) also has two seasonal forms: a summer form (natalensis) which is red with black markings, and a winter form (sesamus) which is blue with a line of red markings on the wings. The winter form is slightly larger than the summer form. In both forms the males and females are alike, however the females are slightly larger.

Intermediate forms of the gaudy commodore are rare in nature, but can readily be produced in conditions created during captive breeding, displaying a wide range of mixtures of the wing patterns of both forms.

== Distribution ==
The nominate northern subspecies (Precis octavia octavia) occurs from eastern Senegal, Guinea, Burkina Faso, Sierra Leone, Liberia, Ghana, Togo, Benin, Nigeria, Cameroon, Gabon, Congo, northern and central DRC, CAR, South Sudan, Ethiopia, Somalia.

Torben Larsen developed a species numbering system for his 2005 publication Butterflies of West Africa. The nominate subspecies is #792. The 'Larsen' numbers have since been used with permission in A Sharp Eye on Butterflies of Ghana, where wet and dry season forms are pictured.

The southern subspecies (Precis octavia sesamus) is found from the border region of the Eastern and Western Cape in South Africa and along the eastern side of South Africa, to Eswatini, Mozambique, Tanzania and Kenya.

== Life cycle ==
=== Eggs ===
The eggs are tiny, rounded, green domes with ribs running up the sides.

=== Larvae ===
The larvae are variable; orange, or orange with black bands, or almost completely black. The final-instar larvae are black when reared at the lower temperatures associated with the winter form, and bright orange when reared at the slightly higher summer temperatures.

Larval food plants are Lamiaceae including Coleus species, Plastostema species, Plectranthus esculentus, Plectranthus fruticosus, Rabdosiella calycina, Pycnostachys reticulata, Pycnostachys urticifolia, and Solenostemon species.

=== Pupae ===
The pupae hang upside down and have a knobbly appearance.

By keeping the pupae at different temperatures (warmer or cooler), the two forms of the adults can be produced, while maintaining pupae at "boundary" temperatures produces transitional forms.

=== Adults ===
The adults feed on nectar and have a year-round flight period. Regional timing of the onset of dry and wet seasons determines the flight times of the respective wet and dry forms in the nominate subspecies, Precis octavia octavia, which is prevalent in West Africa through Central to north-eastern Africa. The dry season form is expressed as the winter form in the southern subspecies Precis octavia sesame which flies from March to September. The wet season form is expressed in the south as the summer form flying from October to March.

The two seasonal forms are not only different in appearance, but also display different behaviour:

In the nominate subspecies, Precis octavia octavia, the dry season form tends to fly less actively than the more territorial wet season form, and is often quiescent in discreet hiding places even under eaves or indoors. It tends to wander towards the forest zone where it may breed seasonally rather than year-round.

Amongst the southern subspecies, Precis octavius sesamus, the males of the summer form display conspicuous hilltopping, and show both territorial and perching behavior. They fly between one and two meters off the ground with a medium-fast "flap-flap-glide" motion. They are often found in grasslands.

The male winter form rarely hilltops, has a random flight pattern, and is often found near forests. In cold weather, the winter form hibernates in holes or under overhanging rocks. Up to 35 individuals may gather together in these places.

The summer and winter form have been seen mating with each other.

== Subspecies ==
- Precis octavia octavia

Range: eastern Senegal, Guinea, Burkina Faso, Sierra Leone, Liberia, Ghana, Togo, Benin, Nigeria, Cameroon, Gabon, Congo, CAR, South Sudan, Ethiopia, Somalia, northern and central DRC

- Precis octavia sesamus Trimen, 1883

Range: Uganda, Angola, southern and eastern DRC, Kenya to Zambia, Mozambique, Zimbabwe, Botswana, northern Namibia, South Africa and Eswatini

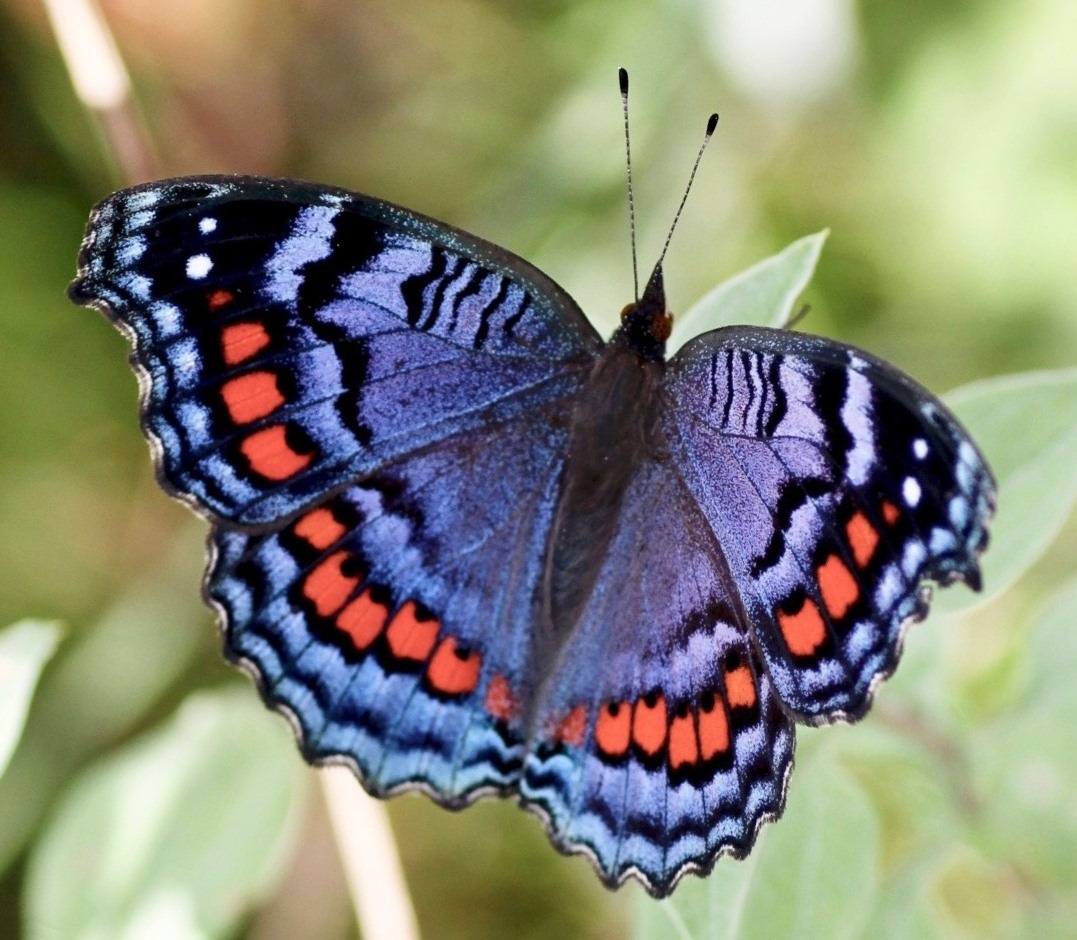
Winter form in the Drakensberg

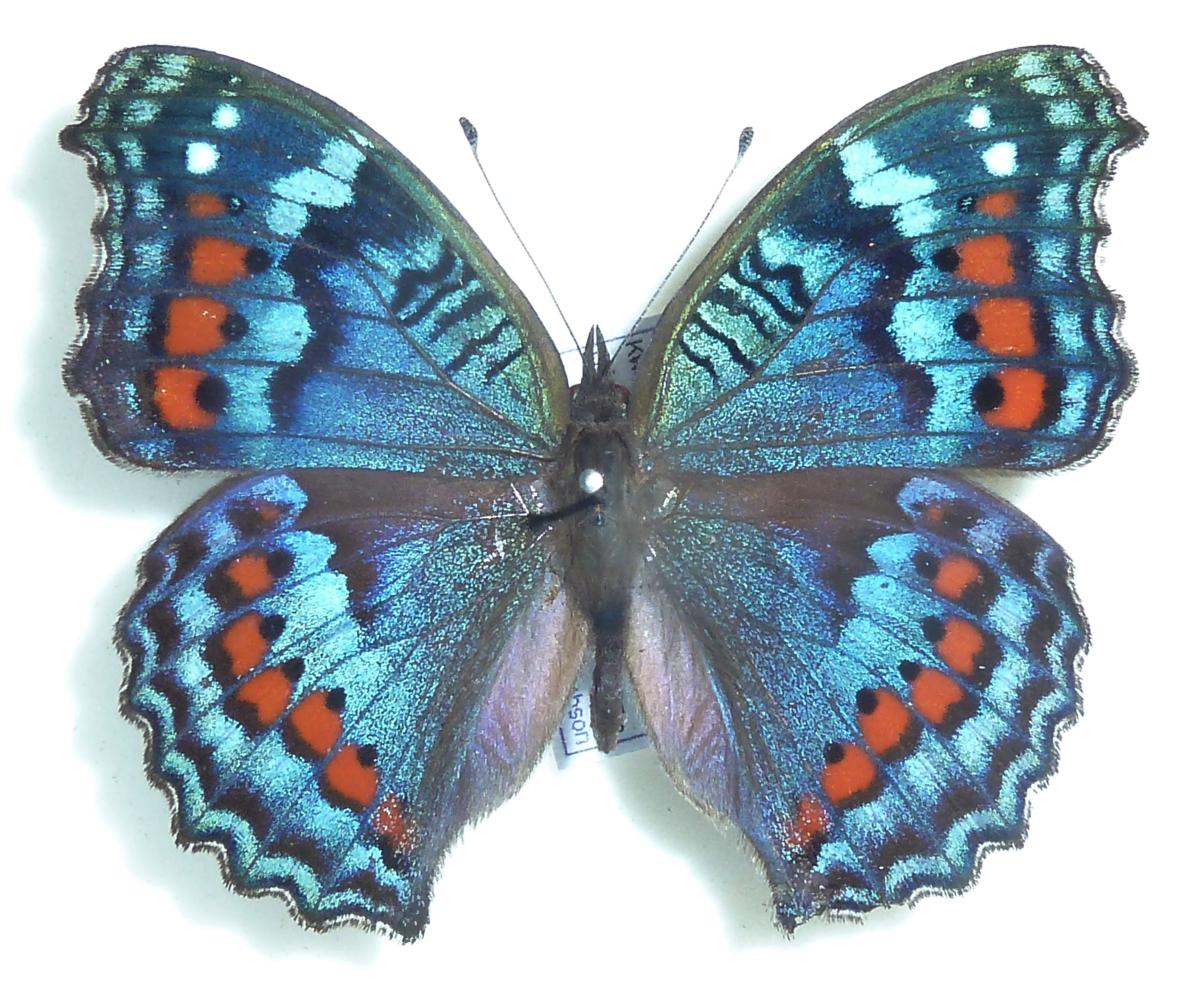
Winter form – mounted specimen

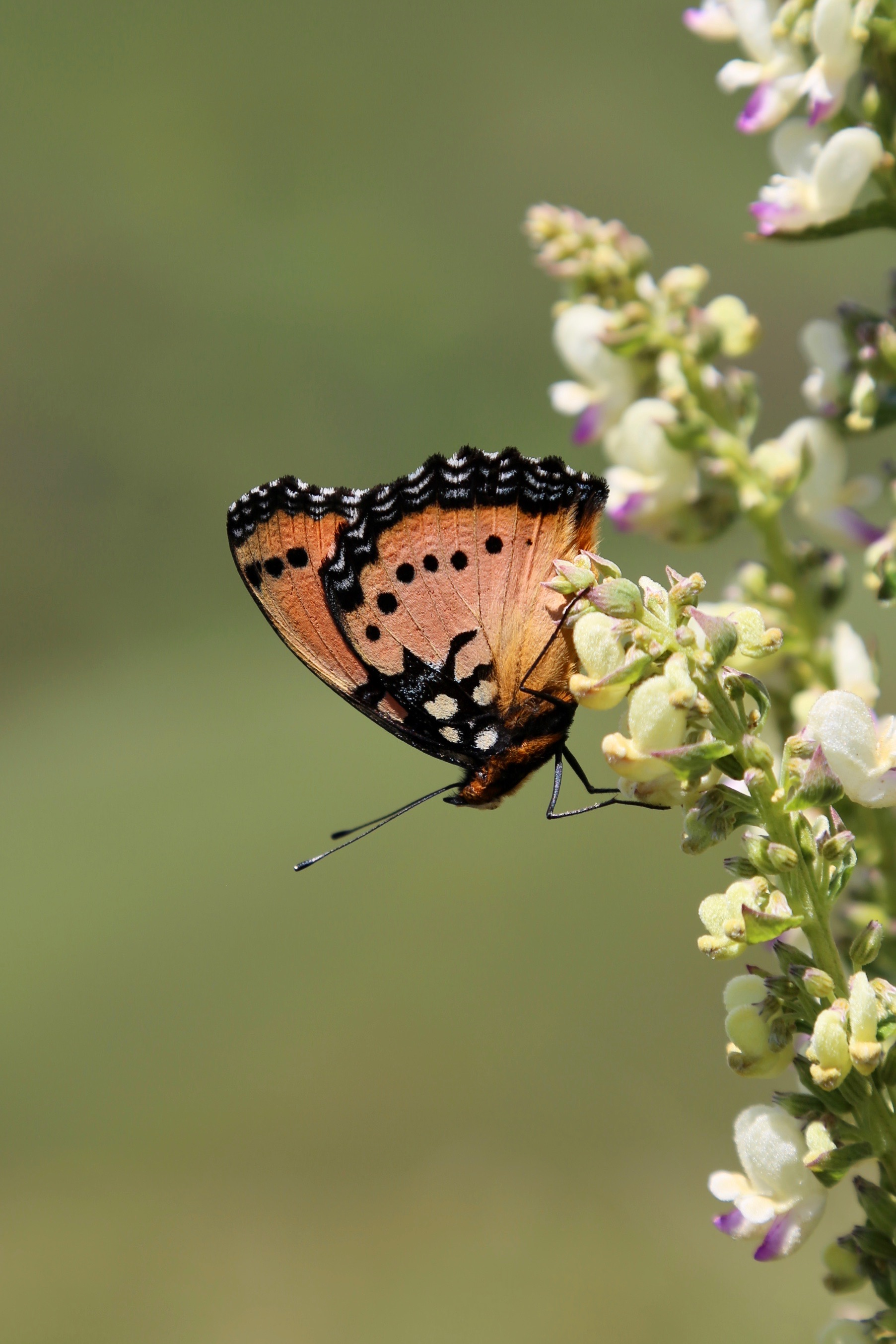
Summer form feeding at Plectranthus flowers

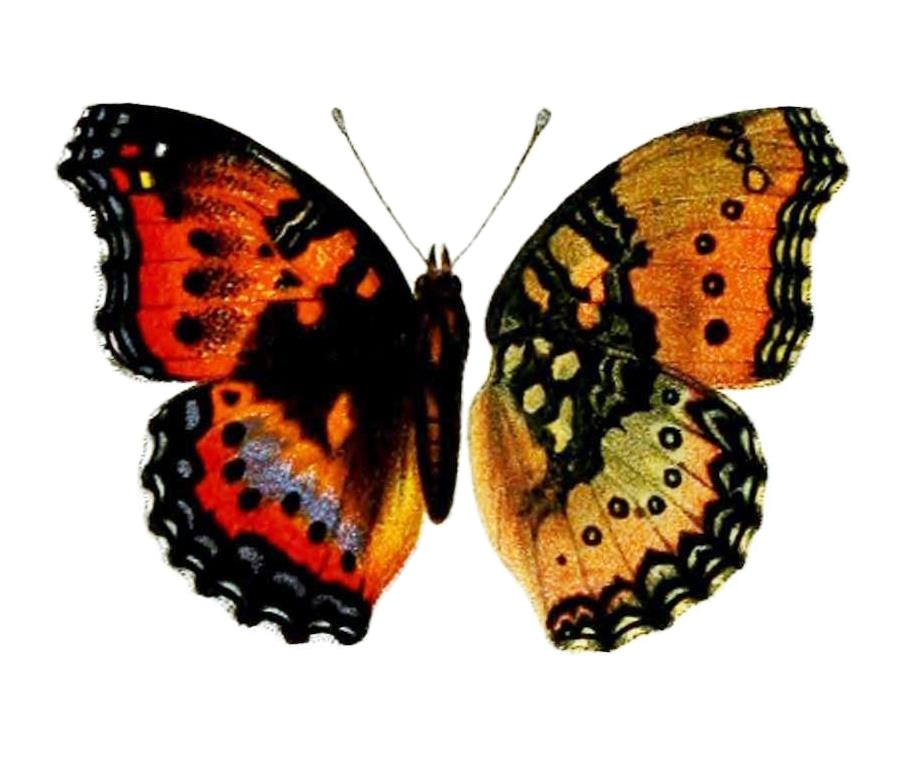
A rare transitional form obtained in Kenya
