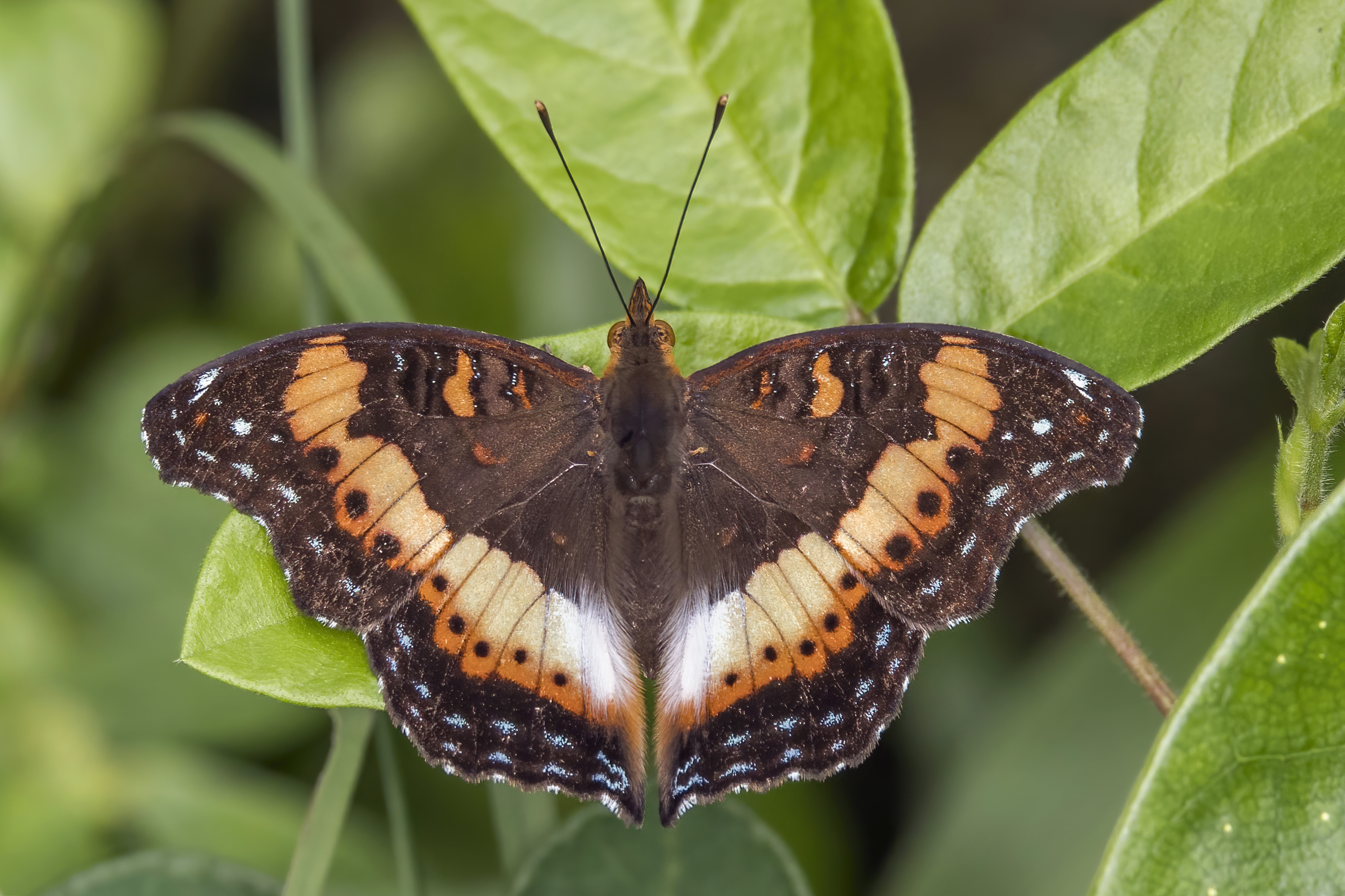
- Wet-season form, São Tomé and Príncipe
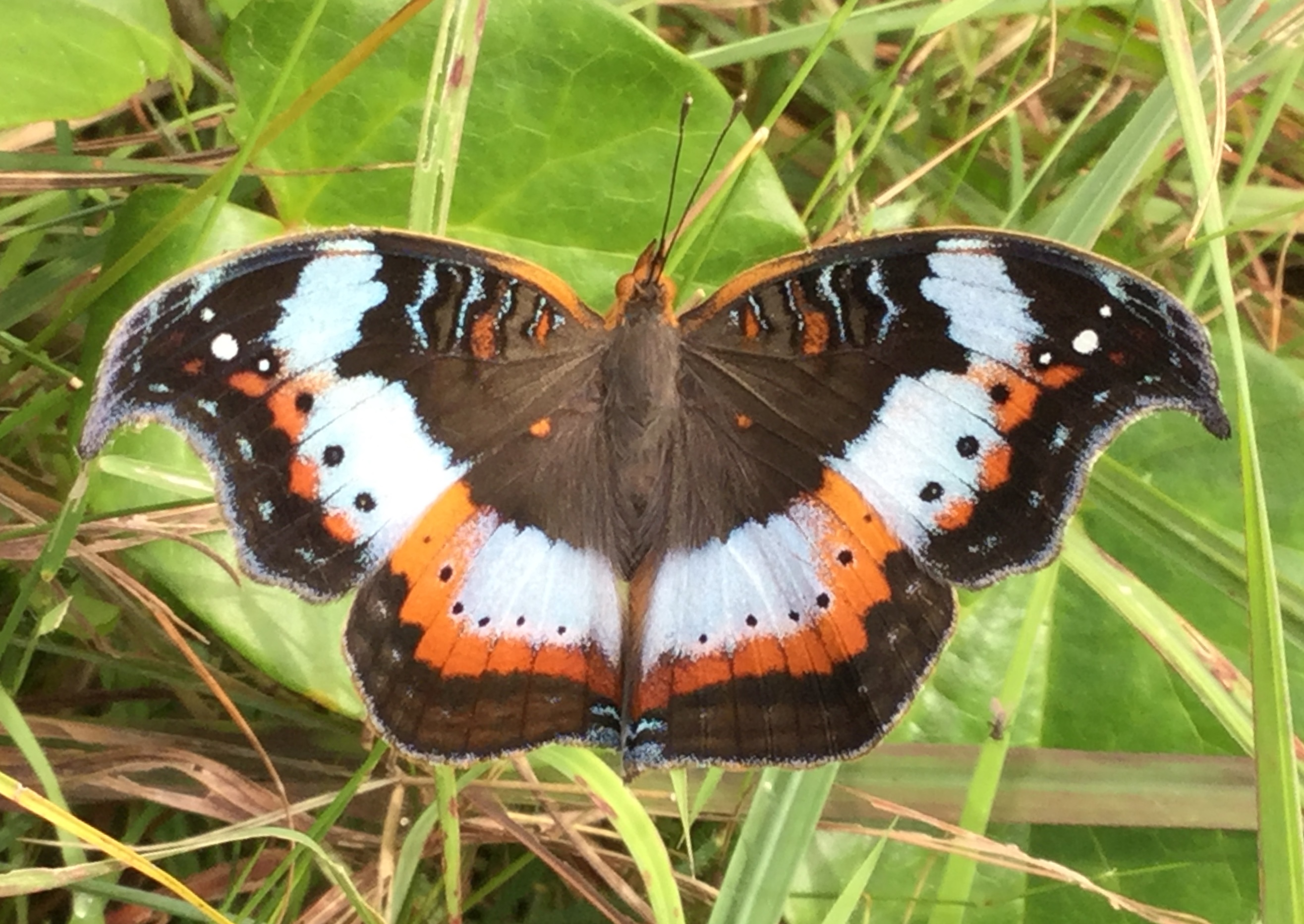
- Dry season form, Uganda

Scientific classification
- Kingdom: Animalia
- Phylum: Arthropoda
- Clade: Pancrustacea
- Class: Insecta
- Order: Lepidoptera
- Family: Nymphalidae
- Genus: Precis
- Species: P. pelarga

Binomial name
- Precis pelarga (Fabricius, 1775)

Synonyms
- Papilio pelarga Fabricius, 1775; Vanessa galami Boisduval, 1833; Papilio leodice Cramer, 1777; Papilio harpyia Fabricius, 1781; Papilio trullus Herbst, 1794; Precis harpyia (Fabricius, 1781); Precis monroviana Staudinger, 1885; Precis pelarga f. moyambensis Wichgraf, 1921; Kallimula pelarga f. proetigiana Stoneham, 1965

= Precis pelarga =

Fashion commodore

Species of butterfly

Precis pelarga, the fashion commodore, is a species of butterfly in the family Nymphalidae which is native to tropical sub-Saharan Africa.

== Description ==
Precis pelarga has a wingspan reaching about 43–51 millimetres (1.7–2.0 in). The forewings are falcate. A clearer band crosses the forewings and hindwings. This band is orange-white in the wet season, bluish white in the dry season (seasonal polymorphism). The basal area of the wings is brown, while the margins are blackish, with a series of small white spots. The undersides of the wings are variegated, with yellowish-brown cryptic colours, mimicking dead leaves. Larvae feed on Solenostemon and Coleus (Lamiaceae species).

== Distribution ==
This species is present in tropical Africa (Senegal, Angola, Zambia, Democratic Republic of the Congo, Uganda, western Kenya, Ethiopia, and Eritrea).

== Habitat ==
Precis pelarga can be found in open forests and in savannah, at an elevation of about 0–1,350 metres (0–4,429 ft) above sea level.

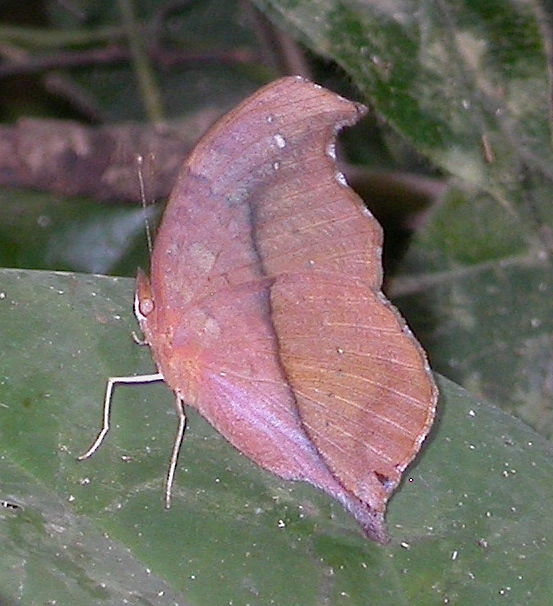
Underwing of an individual in southern Benin

Torben Larsen developed a species numbering system for his 2005 publication Butterflies of West Africa. This species is #797. The 'Larsen' numbers have since been used with permission in A Sharp Eye on Butterflies of Ghana.
