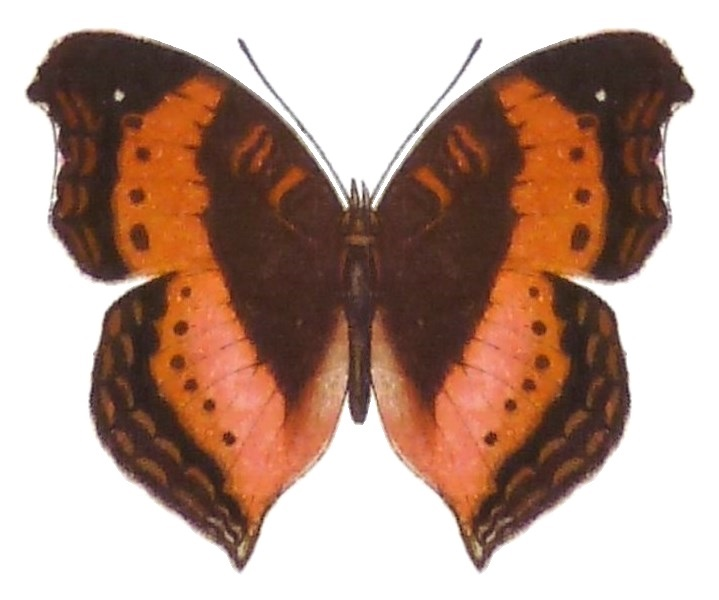
- In Adalbert Seitz's Fauna Africana

Scientific classification
- Kingdom: Animalia
- Phylum: Arthropoda
- Clade: Pancrustacea
- Class: Insecta
- Order: Lepidoptera
- Family: Nymphalidae
- Genus: Precis
- Species: P. milonia

Binomial name
- Precis milonia Felder & Felder, 1867

Synonyms
- Junonia kowara Ward, 1871; Precis milonia var. wintgensi Strand, 1909

= Precis milonia =

Broad-banded commodore

Species of butterfly

Precis milonia, the broad-banded commodore, is a butterfly in the family Nymphalidae. It is found in Nigeria, Cameroon, the Democratic Republic of the Congo, Uganda, Rwanda and Burundi. The habitat consists of primary lowland forests.

== Subspecies ==
- Precis milonia milonia — eastern Nigeria, Cameroon, Democratic Republic of the Congo
- Precis milonia wintgensi Strand, 1909 — eastern Democratic Republic of the Congo, western Uganda, Rwanda, Burundi

Torben Larsen developed a species numbering system for his 2005 publication Butterflies of West Africa. The nominate subspecies is #799. The 'Larsen' numbers have since been used with permission in A Sharp Eye on Butterflies of Ghana.
