= Precis frobeniusi =

Toothed commodore

Scientific classification
- Kingdom: Animalia
- Phylum: Arthropoda
- Clade: Pancrustacea
- Class: Insecta
- Order: Lepidoptera
- Family: Nymphalidae
- Genus: Precis
- Species: P. frobeniusi

Binomial name
- Precis frobeniusi Strand, 1909

Synonyms
- Precis archesia var. frobeniusi Strand, 1909

Species of butterfly

Precis frobeniusi, the toothed commodore, is a butterfly in the family Nymphalidae. It is found in Guinea, Sierra Leone, Liberia and northern Nigeria. The habitat consists of stream beds in dry, hilly areas in savanna.
