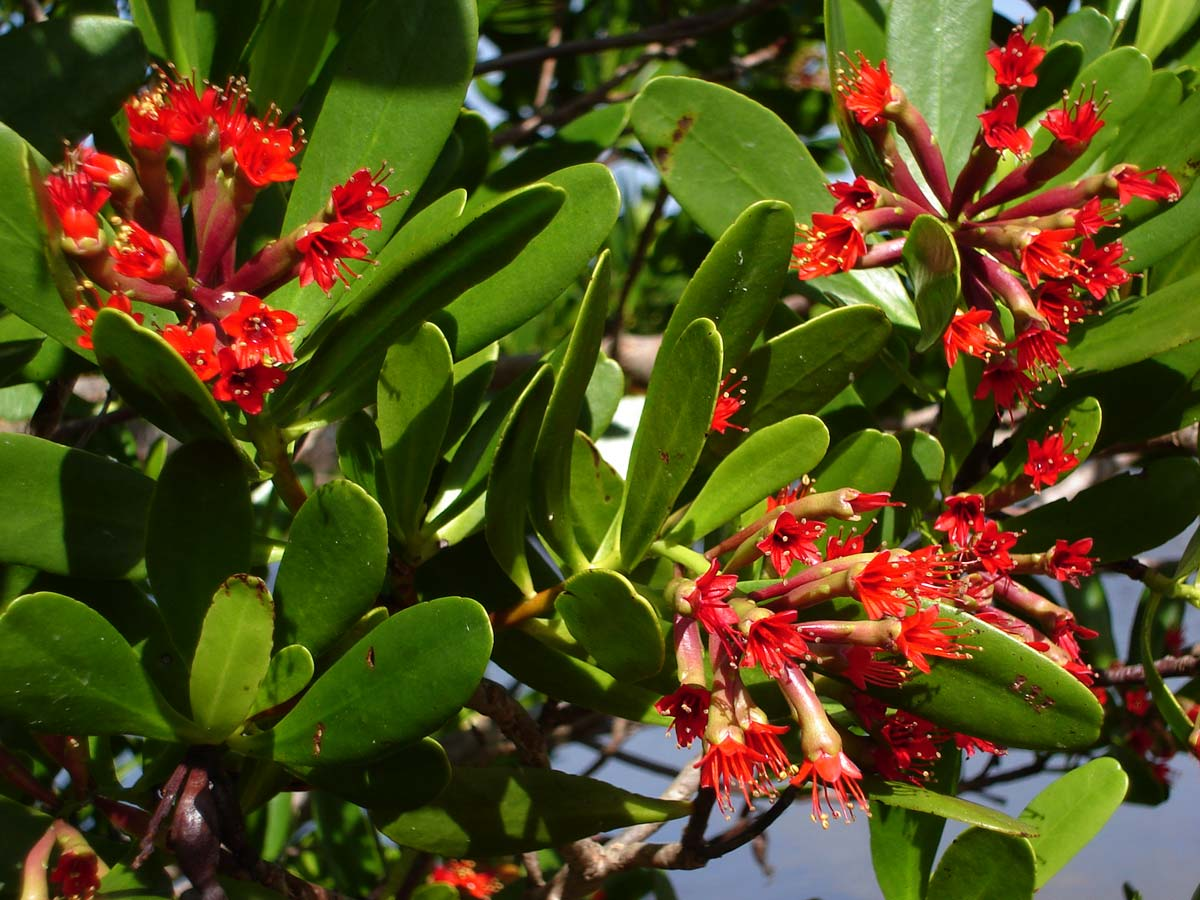

Conservation status
- Critically Endangered (IUCN 3.1)

Scientific classification
- Kingdom: Plantae
- Clade: Tracheophytes
- Clade: Angiosperms
- Clade: Eudicots
- Clade: Rosids
- Order: Myrtales
- Family: Combretaceae
- Genus: Lumnitzera
- Species: L. littorea

Binomial name
- Lumnitzera littorea (Jack) Voigt

Synonyms
- Bruguiera littorea (Jack) Steud.; Laguncularia coccinea Gaudich.; Laguncularia haenkei Endl.; Laguncularia pedicellata Steud.; Laguncularia purpurea Gaudich.; Lumnitzera coccinea Wight & Arn.; Lumnitzera pedicellata C.Presl; Lumnitzera pentandra Griff.; Lumnitzera purpurea (Gaudich.) C.Presl; Petaloma coccineum Blanco; Pyrrhanthus littoreus Jack

= Lumnitzera littorea =

Species of tree

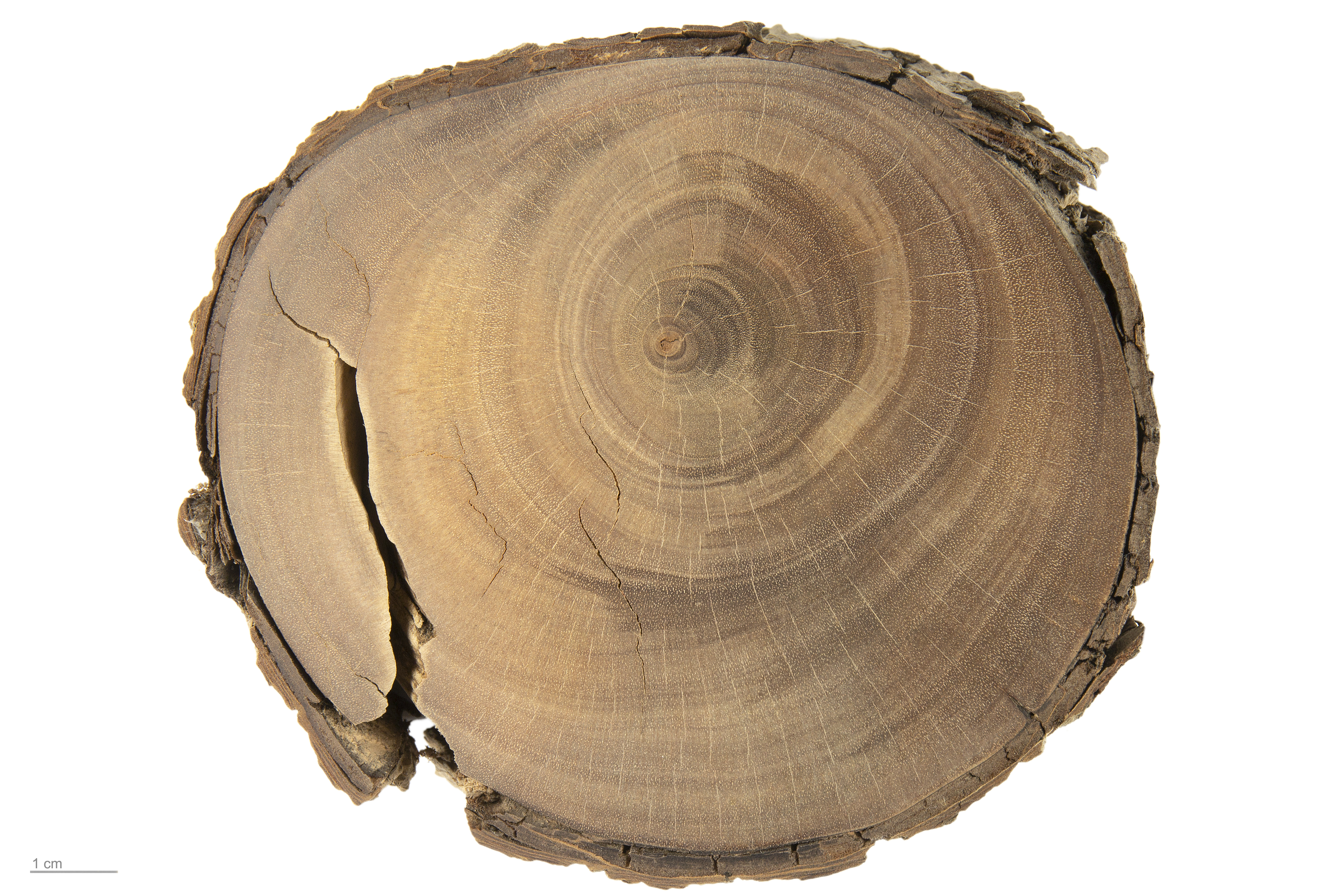
Lumnitzera littorea (MHNT)

Lumnitzera littorea is a species of mangrove. It is native to tropical coastal and estuarine areas of the eastern Indian Ocean and western Pacific Ocean, Including India, Sri Lanka, the Andaman Islands, Myanmar, Thailand, Malaysia, Brunei, Indonesia, Cambodia, Vietnam, Hainan, the Philippines, Timor Leste, New Guinea, northern Australia (Northern Territory and Queensland), the Solomon Islands, and Vanuatu.
