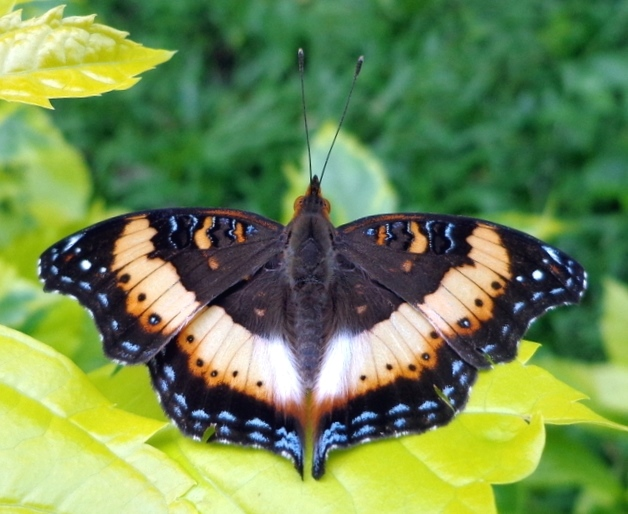
- Wet-season form of the fashion commodore basking in a garden

Scientific classification
- Kingdom: Animalia
- Phylum: Arthropoda
- Clade: Pancrustacea
- Class: Insecta
- Order: Lepidoptera
- Family: Nymphalidae
- Tribe: Junoniini
- Genus: Precis; Hübner, [1819]

Species
- See text

Synonyms
- Coryphaeola (Butler, 1878); Kallimula (Holland, 1920)

= Precis (butterfly) =

Genus of butterflies

Seasonal forms in Precis
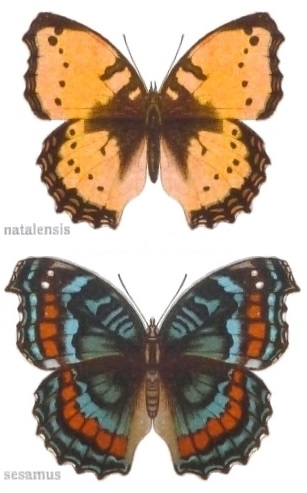
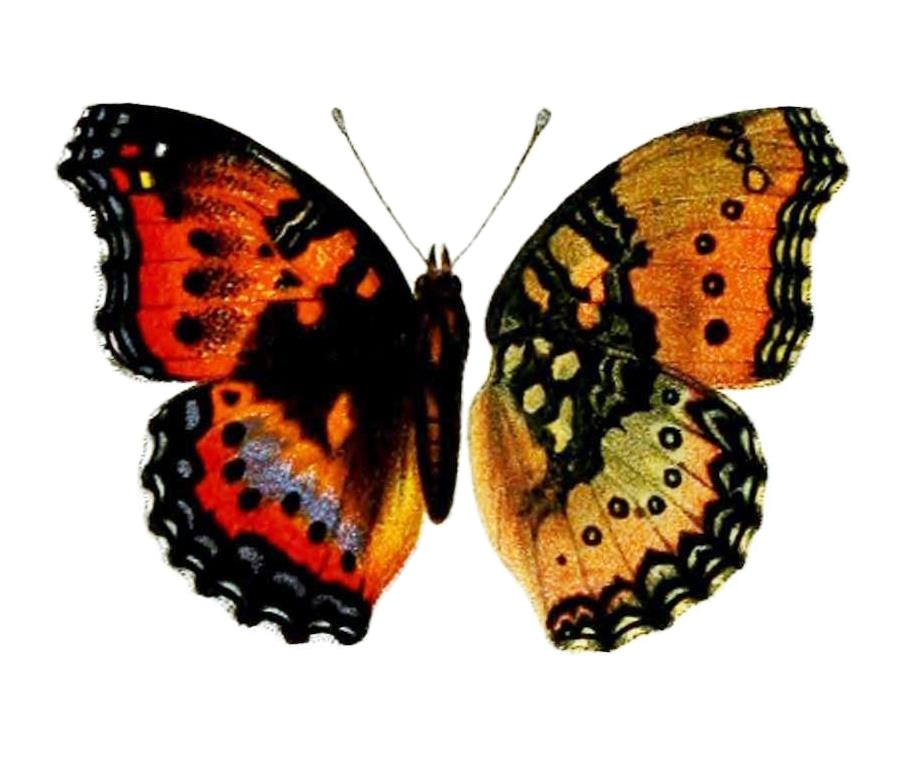
Wet-season, dry-season and transitional forms of P. octavia

Precis is a genus of nymphalid butterflies that Jacob Hübner described in 1819. They are commonly known as commodores and are found in Africa. Two species are endemic to Madagascar.

== Description ==
Precis are medium-to-large butterflies (wingspan up to 5 cm). The upperside ground colour is black with white, pink, green, or blue spots and bands, the upperside may also have a brownish ground colour. The wings often have eyespots. The outer wing margins are wavy and toothed or scalloped. Several species occur in multiple colour forms (morphs). They tend to have distinct rainy-season and dry-season forms, that of the gaudy commodore being the most extreme. Transitional forms are also known.

== Biology ==
Precis are savannah species. They are good fliers. The larvae feed on Lamiaceae.

== Taxonomy ==
The genus Precis is closely allied to Junonia. The two genera differ in the structure of their genitalia and larval food plant choice. The type species of the genus is Precis octavia.

== Species ==
Listed alphabetically:

- Precis actia Distant, 1880 — air commodore
- Precis andremiaja Boisduval, 1833
- Precis antilope (Feisthamel, 1850) — darker commodore
- Precis archesia (Cramer, [1779]) — garden inspector or garden commodore
- Precis ceryne (Boisduval, 1847) — marsh commodore
- Precis coelestina Dewitz, 1879 — ocellated commodore
- Precis cuama (Hewitson, 1864) — paler commodore
- Precis eurodoce (Westwood, 1850) — Madagascar commodore
- Precis frobeniusi Strand, 1909 — toothed commodore
- Precis koivoguii Sáfián & Florczyk & Takano, 2023 — Nimba commodore
- Precis limnoria (Klug, 1845) — white-spotted commodore
- Precis milonia C.&R.Felder, [1867] — broad-banded commodore
- Precis octavia (Cramer, [1777]) — gaudy commodore
- Precis pelarga (Fabricius, 1775) — fashion commodore
- Precis rauana (Grose-Smith, 1898) — montane commodore
- Precis sinuata Plötz, 1880 — wide-banded commodore
- Precis tugela Trimen, 1879 — African leaf butterfly, dry-leaf butterfly or eared commodore

Incertae sedis

- Precis permagna Martin, 1920

A photograph of the male of the newly discovered species P. koivoguii is included in A Sharp Eye on Butterflies of Ghana.
