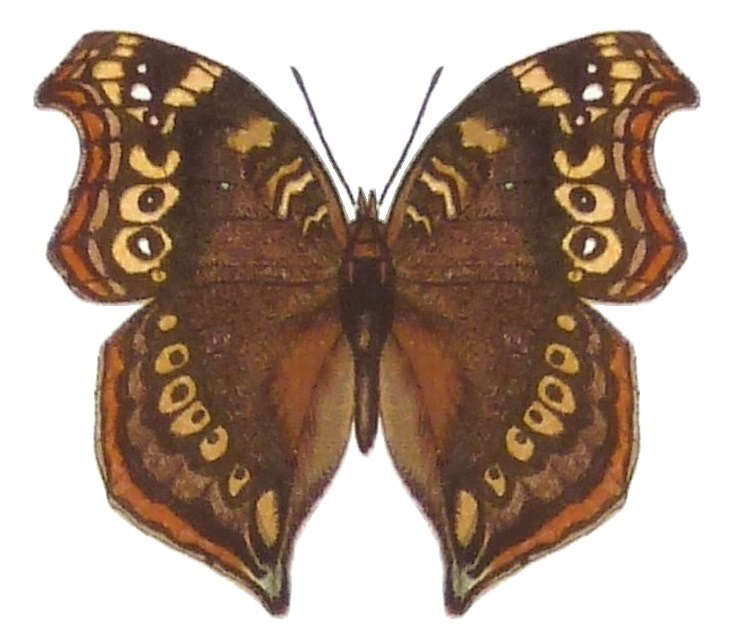
- In Adalbert Seitz's Fauna Africana

Scientific classification
- Domain: Eukaryota
- Kingdom: Animalia
- Phylum: Arthropoda
- Class: Insecta
- Order: Lepidoptera
- Family: Nymphalidae
- Genus: Precis
- Species: P. coelestina

Binomial name
- Precis coelestina Dewitz, 1879

Synonyms
- Precis coelestina f. jordani Aurivillius, 1913; Kallimula coelestina f. obscurans Stoneham, 1965

= Precis coelestina =

Ocellated commodore

Species of butterfly

Precis coelestina, the ocellated commodore, is a butterfly in the family Nymphalidae. It is found in Guinea, Sierra Leone, Nigeria, Cameroon, Angola, the Central African Republic, the Democratic Republic of the Congo (Kinshasa, Kasai, Sankuru, Lualaba), Uganda, western Kenya, southern Sudan, western Ethiopia and Somalia. The habitat consists of semi montane areas.
