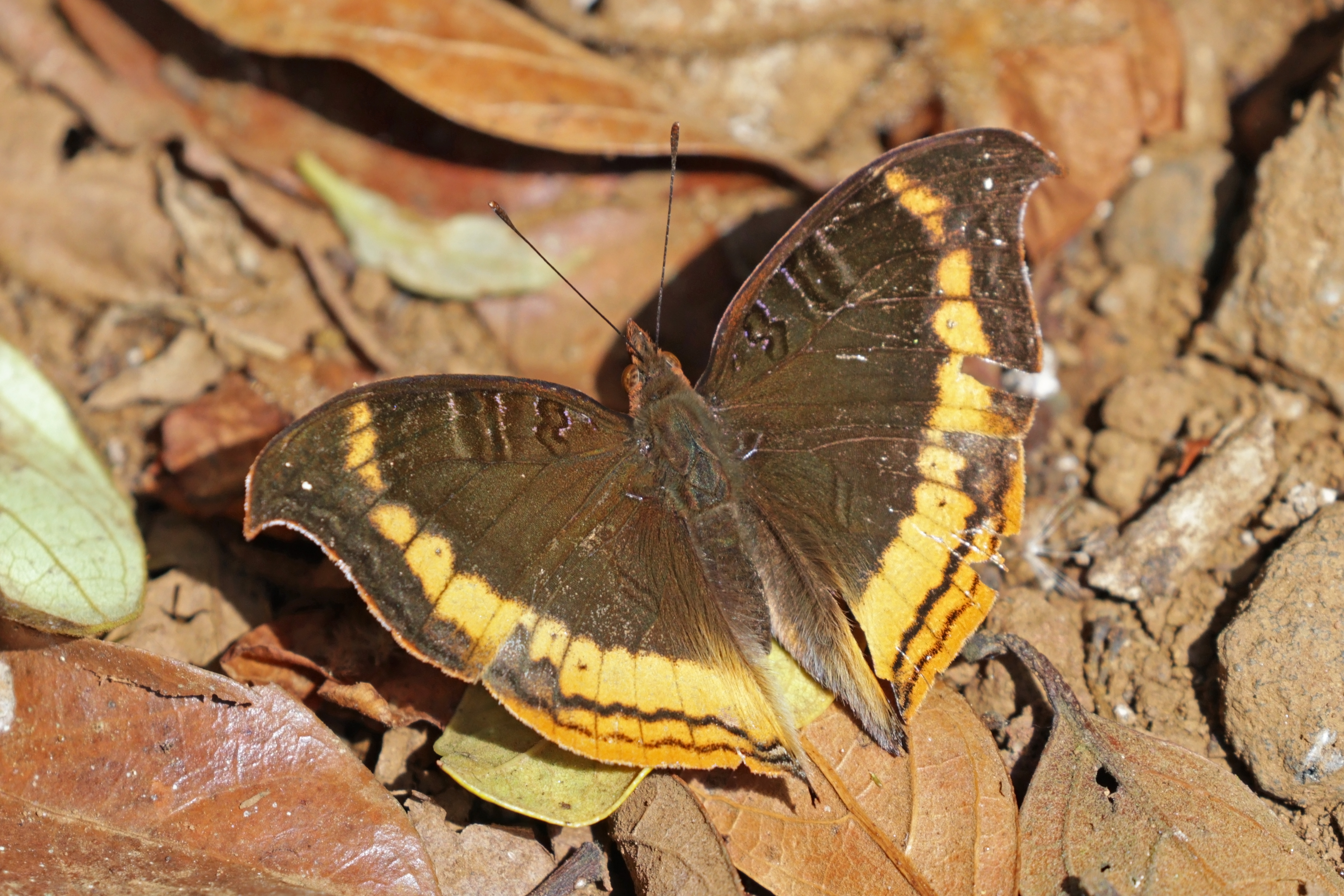
- in Montagne d'Ambre National Park, Madagascar

Scientific classification
- Domain: Eukaryota
- Kingdom: Animalia
- Phylum: Arthropoda
- Class: Insecta
- Order: Lepidoptera
- Family: Nymphalidae
- Genus: Precis
- Species: P. eurodoce

Binomial name
- Precis eurodoce (Westwood, 1850)

Synonyms
- Kallima eurodoce Westwood, [1850]; Precis eurodoce f. falcifera Fiedler, 1928

= Precis eurodoce =

Species of butterfly

Precis eurodoce, the Madagascar commodore, is a butterfly in the family Nymphalidae. It is found on Madagascar. The habitat consists of forests.
