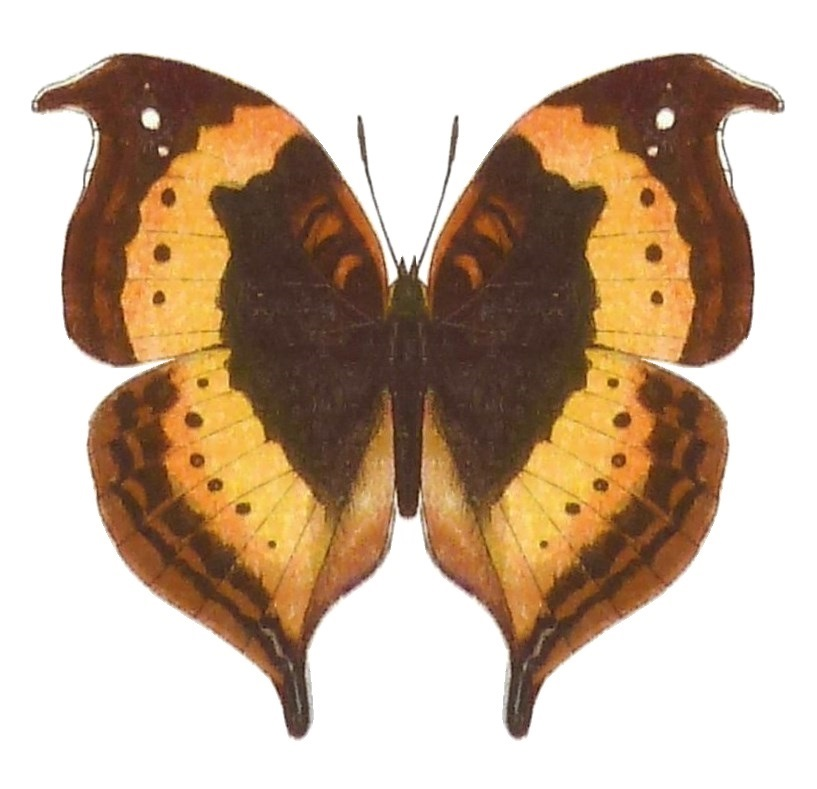
- In Adalbert Seitz's Fauna Africana

Scientific classification
- Domain: Eukaryota
- Kingdom: Animalia
- Phylum: Arthropoda
- Class: Insecta
- Order: Lepidoptera
- Family: Nymphalidae
- Genus: Precis
- Species: P. tugela

Binomial name
- Precis tugela Trimen, 1879

Synonyms
- Junonia tugela; Junonia aurorina Butler, 1894; Junonia pyriformis Butler, 1896

= Precis tugela =

African leaf butterfly

Species of butterfly

Precis tugela, the African leaf butterfly or eared commodore, is a butterfly of the family Nymphalidae. It is found in eastern and southern Africa, ranging from Ethiopia to South Africa. It is commonly included in the genus Junonia rather than Precis.

The wingspan is 55–60 mm in males and 58–64 mm in females.

The larvae feed on Plectranthus species and Englerastrum scandens.

== Subspecies ==
- Precis tugela tugela — eastern Zimbabwe, Eswatini, South Africa: Limpopo, Mpumalanga, KwaZulu-Natal
- Precis tugela aurorina (Butler, 1894) — southern Sudan, Ethiopia, Kenya, northern and eastern Tanzania, Malawi
- Precis tugela pyriformis (Butler, 1896) — western Uganda, Rwanda, Burundi, north-western Tanzania, northern Zambia, Democratic Republic of the Congo: Kivu, Shaba, Lomami, Lualaba
