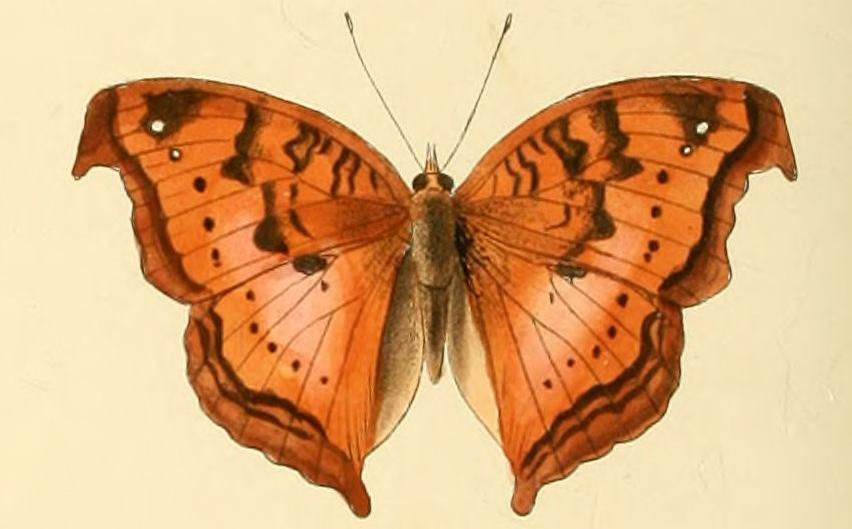

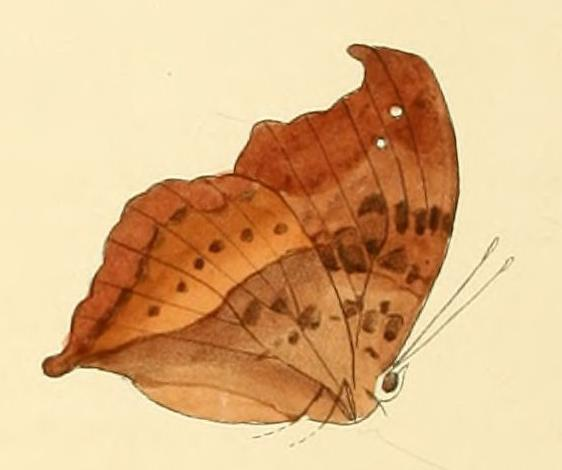

Scientific classification
- Domain: Eukaryota
- Kingdom: Animalia
- Phylum: Arthropoda
- Class: Insecta
- Order: Lepidoptera
- Family: Nymphalidae
- Genus: Precis
- Species: P. cuama

Binomial name
- Precis cuama (Hewitson, 1864)

Synonyms
- Junonia cuama Hewitson, 1864; Junonia trimeni Butler, 1894

= Precis cuama =

Paler commodore

Species of butterfly

Precis cuama, the paler commodore, is a butterfly in the family Nymphalidae. It is found in the Democratic Republic of the Congo (Shaba), eastern and central Tanzania, Malawi, Zambia, Mozambique and Zimbabwe. The habitat consists of savanna and open woodland, especially in rocky areas.

Adults are on wing from December to July.
