= Platostoma rotundifolium =

Conservation status
- Least Concern (SANBI Red List)

Scientific classification
- Kingdom: Plantae
- Clade: Tracheophytes
- Clade: Angiosperms
- Clade: Eudicots
- Clade: Asterids
- Order: Lamiales
- Family: Lamiaceae
- Genus: Platostoma
- Species: P. rotundifolium

Binomial name
- Platostoma rotundifolium (Briq.) A.J.Paton

Synonyms
- Geniosporum affine Gürke; Geniosporum angolense Briq.; Geniosporum paludosum Baker; Geniosporum rotundifolium Briq.; Geniosporum scabridum Briq.; Ocimum konianense A.Chev.; Ocimum paludosum (Baker) Roberty; Plectranthus etiolatus Chiov.

Species of flowering plant

Platostoma rotundifolium is a species of jellywort native to much of sub-Saharan Africa.

== Description ==
This species is a perennial herb or small shrub growing 0.6–1 m (2 ft 0 in – 3 ft 3 in) tall. It arises from a horizontal woody rhizome and is not known to be aromatic. The stems are erect, square in cross-section, and branch mainly in the upper parts. They are covered with short hairs, which may point upwards or backwards, and scattered small surface glands.

The leaves are stalked and often bend downwards. The leaf blades are ovate to oblong, measuring 15–85 mm (0.59–3.35 in) long and 10–35 mm (0.39–1.38 in) wide. They have serrated to scalloped margins that are often slightly rolled under, with blunt tips and bases that are heart-shaped or wedge-shaped. The leaves are hairy to densely hairy and bear scattered surface glands; the upper leaves are frequently white, pink, or purplish in colour. The leaf stalks are short, about 3–10 mm (0.12–0.39 in) long.

The inflorescence is dense, with many-flowered whorls packed closely together so that they touch. The upper bracts are green and upright, forming a small terminal tuft, while the lower bracts are white, pink, or purple, spreading or bending downwards and becoming leaf-like. The flower stalks are slightly flattened and 2–3 mm (0.079–0.118 in) long.

The calyx is very small, only 1–1.5 mm (0.039–0.059 in) long at flowering, and densely hairy with surface glands. It enlarges to 2–3.5 mm (0.079–0.138 in) in fruit. The throat is partly closed by the shape of the calyx lobes. The corolla is white or purple, 3–5 mm (0.12–0.20 in) long, with a short tube. The stamens protrude slightly beyond the corolla, up to 2 mm (0.079 in).

The ovary is smooth. The fruits consist of dark brown, obovoid nutlets about 1 mm (0.039 in) long, with fine longitudinal ridges and usually smooth surfaces, though young nutlets may bear small hairs.

== Distribution and habitat ==
Platostoma rotundifolium is widespread in tropical Africa, where it grows in grassland (especially where prone to flooding), alongside streams, and in other marshy places. It has been recorded in Angola, Benin, Burundi, Cameroon, the Republic of the Congo, the Democratic Republic of the Congo, Eswatini, Ethiopia, Guinea, Ivory Coast, Kenya, Malawi, Mozambique, Nigeria, Rwanda, Sierra Leone, South Africa, South Sudan, Tanzania, Uganda, and Zambia.

== See also ==
- List of Lamiaceae of South Africa
