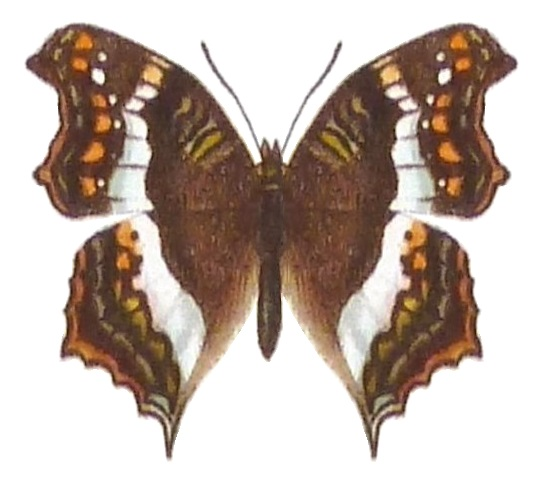

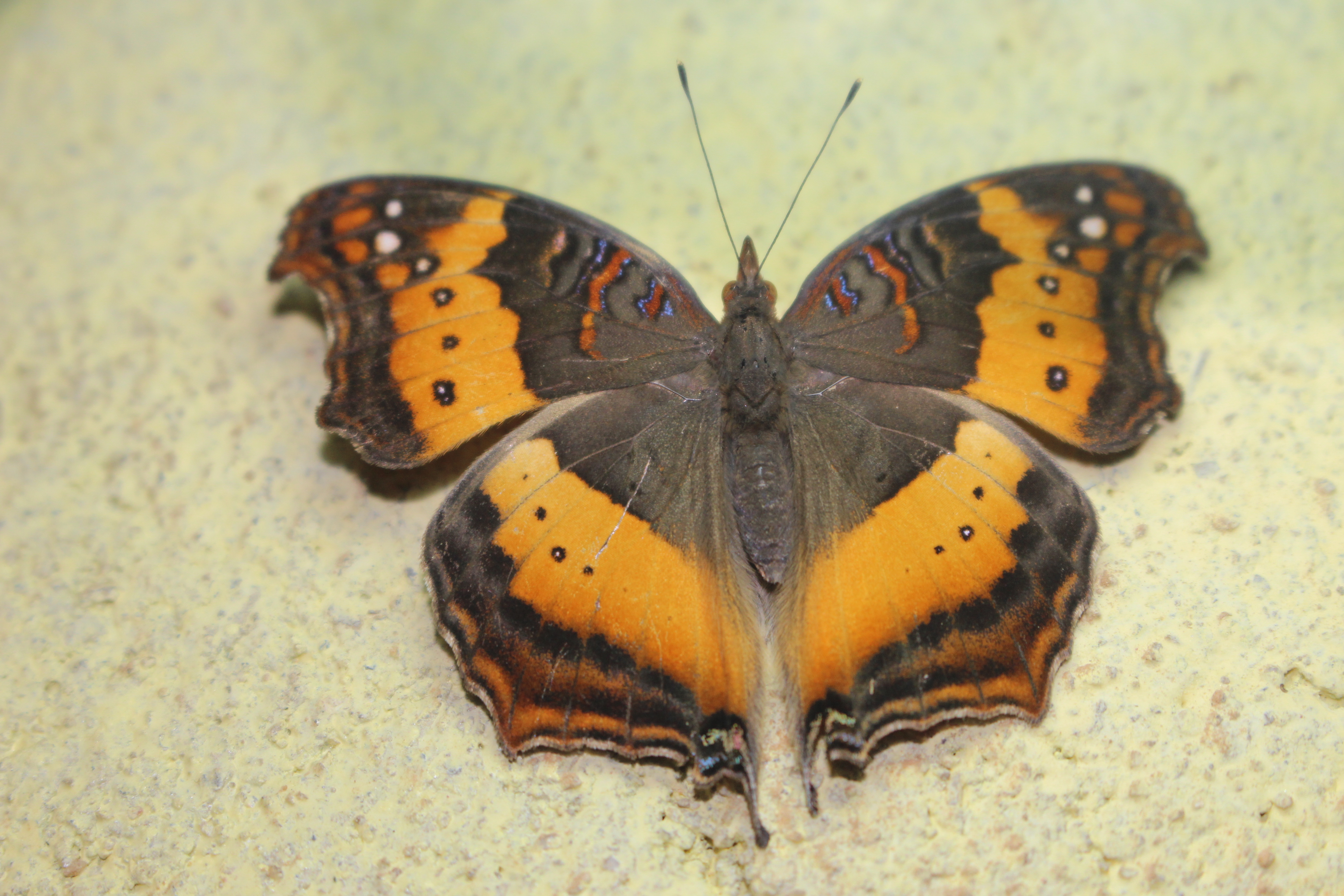
- Male illustrated in Adalbert Seitz's Fauna Africana, and female near Antananarivo, Madagascar

Scientific classification
- Domain: Eukaryota
- Kingdom: Animalia
- Phylum: Arthropoda
- Class: Insecta
- Order: Lepidoptera
- Family: Nymphalidae
- Genus: Precis
- Species: P. andremiaja

Binomial name
- Precis andremiaja (Boisduval, 1833)

Synonyms
- Vanessa andremiaja Boisduval, 1833; Vanessa musa Guérin-Méneville, 1844; Precis boisduvali Staudinger, 1885; Junonia andremiaja Boisduval, 1833

= Precis andremiaja =

Species of butterfly

Precis andremiaja is a butterfly in the family Nymphalidae. It is found on Madagascar. The habitat consists of forest margins and anthropogenic environments. J. andremiaja is said by Mr. Cowan to be "common in houses on warm days".
