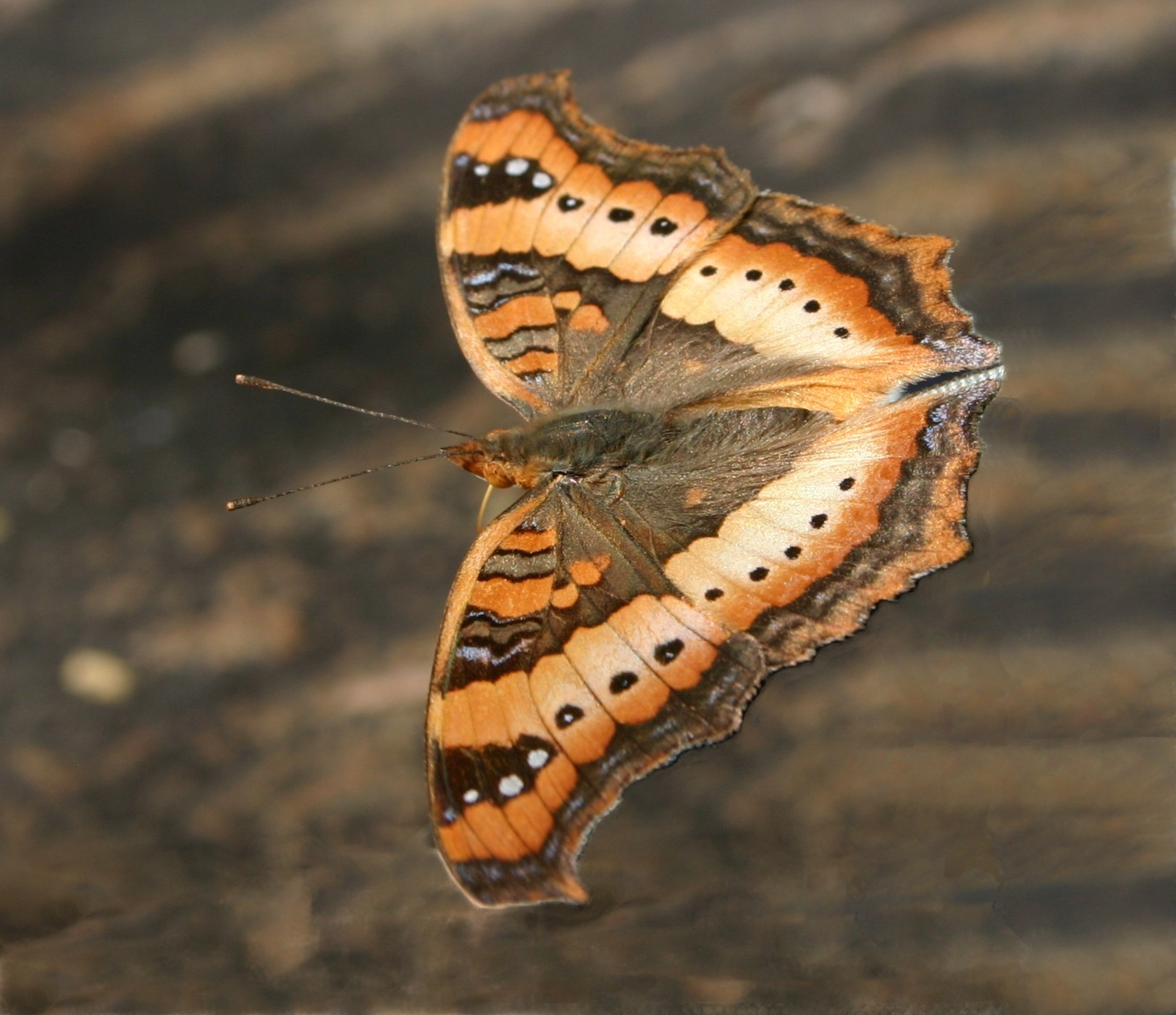
- The dry-season form (f. tukuoa) of the nominate subspecies in South Africa

Scientific classification
- Domain: Eukaryota
- Kingdom: Animalia
- Phylum: Arthropoda
- Class: Insecta
- Order: Lepidoptera
- Family: Nymphalidae
- Genus: Precis
- Species: P. ceryne

Binomial name
- Precis ceryne (Boisduval, 1847)

Synonyms
- Salamis ceryne Boisduval, 1847; Salamis tukuoa Wallengren, 1857; Kallimula ceryne f. achaeus Stoneham, 1965; Kallimula ceryne f. obscura Stoneham, 1965

= Precis ceryne =

Marsh commodore

Species of butterfly

Precis ceryne, the marsh commodore, is a species of butterfly in the family Nymphalidae, native to Subsaharan Africa.

Wingspan: 40–45 mm in males and 42–50 mm in females.

== Subspecies ==
- P. c. ceryne – Republic of the Congo, Central African Republic, Angola, Democratic Republic of the Congo, Uganda, Rwanda, Burundi, Ethiopia, Kenya, Tanzania, Zambia, Mozambique, Zimbabwe, Botswana, South Africa, Eswatini
- P. c. ceruana Rothschild & Jordan, 1903 – Guinea, Burkina Faso, Ivory Coast, Ghana, Benin, Nigeria, Cameroon

== Diet ==
Larval food plants include Coleus, Plastostema, and Pycnostachys species.
