= Platostoma menthoides =

Scientific classification
- Kingdom: Plantae
- Clade: Tracheophytes
- Clade: Angiosperms
- Clade: Eudicots
- Clade: Asterids
- Order: Lamiales
- Family: Lamiaceae
- Genus: Platostoma
- Species: P. menthoides

Binomial name
- Platostoma menthoides (L.) A.J.Paton

Synonyms
- Elsholtzia ocimoides Pers.; Geniosporum gracile Benth.; Geniosporum menthoides (L.) Druce; Geniosporum prostratum (L.) Benth.; Lumnitzera prostrata (L.) Spreng.; Mentha ocymoides Lam.; Ocimum macrostachyum Poir.; Ocimum menthoides L.; Ocimum prostratum L.; Thymus indicus Burm.f.

Species of flowering plant

Platostoma menthoides is a species of plant belonging to the mint family Lamiaceae and is found widely in Tamil Nadu, India. Traditionally this plant used in common cold and febrifuge.

== Acute oral toxicity study ==
In Acute Oral Toxicity Study, no mortality was found at the end of study and sign of toxicity like change in skin and fur, eyes and mucous membrane, and also respiratory, circulatory, autonomic, and central nervous system and somatomotor activity, behavior pattern, sign of tremors, convulsions, salvation, lethargy, sleep, coma were also not found.

== Antipyretic activity ==
Ethanolic extract of bark of Platostoma menthoides on yeast-induced pyrexia shows significant effect.
