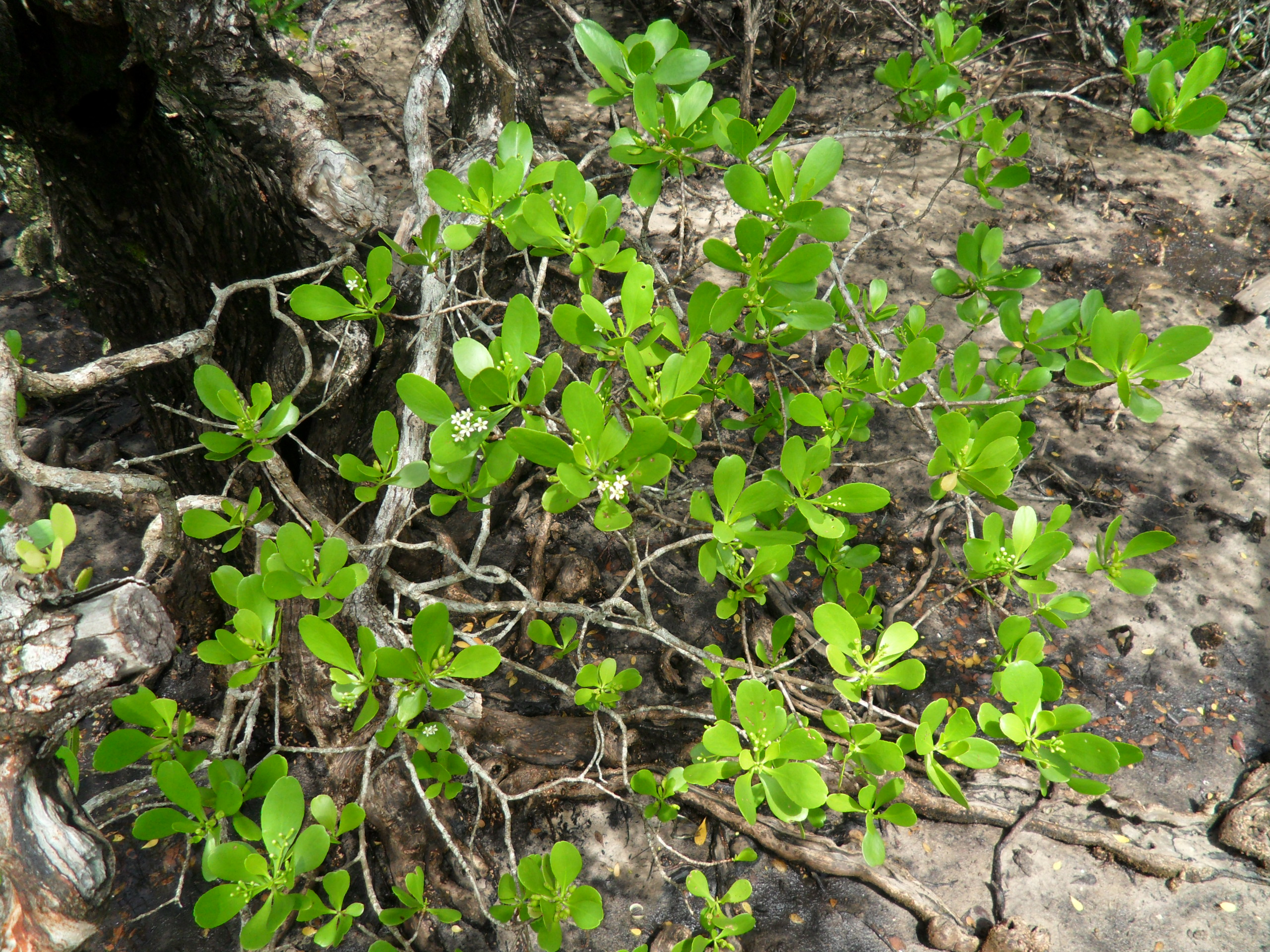

Conservation status
- Near Threatened (IUCN 3.1)

Scientific classification
- Kingdom: Plantae
- Clade: Tracheophytes
- Clade: Angiosperms
- Clade: Eudicots
- Clade: Rosids
- Order: Myrtales
- Family: Combretaceae
- Genus: Lumnitzera
- Species: L. racemosa

Binomial name
- Lumnitzera racemosa Willd., Neue Schriften Ges. Naturf. Freunde Berlin iv. (1803) 187

Synonyms
- List: Bruguiera madagascariensis DC.; B. obtusa Steud.; Funckia karakandel Dennst.; Jussiaea racemosa Rottler ex DC.; Laguncularia rosea Gaudich.; Petaloma alba Blanco; P albiflora Zipp. ex Span.; P. alternifolia Roxb.; Pokornya ettingshausenii Montrouz.; Problastes cuneifolia Reinw.; Rhizophora obtusa Dennst.

= Lumnitzera racemosa =

Species of tree

Lumnitzera racemosa, commonly known as the white-flowered black mangrove, is a species of mangrove in the family Combretaceae. It is found on the eastern coast of Africa and other places in the western Indo-Pacific region. It has one accepted variety from the noniminate species which is Lumnitzera racemosa var. lutea (Gaudich.) Exell.

== Description ==
Lumnitzera racemosa is a small to medium-sized evergreen tree, growing to a maximum height of 37 m (121 ft). It develops pneumatophores and often has stilt roots. The leaves are arranged spirally at the tips of the shoots; they are simple and obovate, with slightly toothed margins. The inflorescences grow in short spikes in the axils of the leaves or at the tips of the shoots. The flowers are small and white, and are followed by woody, flattened fruits containing a single seed.

== Distribution and habitat ==
This species is native from KwaZulu-Natal to southeast Kenya in the western Indian Ocean, tropical & subtropical Asia to the western Pacific. Its range includes KwaZulu-Natal, Mozambique, Tanzania, Kenya, Madagascar, Aldabra, Seychelles, Chagos Archipelago, Maldives, India, Sri Lanka, Andaman Islands, Nicobar Islands, Bangladesh, Myanmar, Thailand, Cambodia, Vietnam, southeast China, Hainan, Taiwan, Nansei-shoto, Korea, South China Sea, Philippines, Peninsular Malaysia, Jawa, Lesser Sunda Islands, New Guinea, and New Caledonia. In Mozambique it is one of only ten mangrove species. It grows in the higher part of the intertidal zone and is found both on beaches and lining the banks of creeks. It is a fast-growing, pioneering species.

== Uses ==
The timber of Lumnitzera racemosa is strong and durable and has many uses, including bridge construction. The wood is highly favoured for charcoal making in Cambodia. The bark is harvested for the tannins it contains.

== Status ==
Mangroves in general are under threat from coastal development, and this species, which grows on the landward edge of the mangrove area, may be more threatened by rising sea levels than are other species because it may be unable to move further inland. There may be a decline in populations of this species due to habitat loss or harvesting, but it is a common species of mangrove with a very wide range, and is not declining at a sufficient rate to be included in any threatened category, so it is listed by the International Union for Conservation of Nature as being of "least concern".

The variety of racemosa, also known as Tonga mangrove (Afrikaans: Tonga-wortelboom, Zulu: Isikhaha-esibomvu), is a protected tree in South Africa.

== Common names ==
The plant is known by a variety of common names. These include krâ:nhob sâ: (sâ:=white< Khmer)
