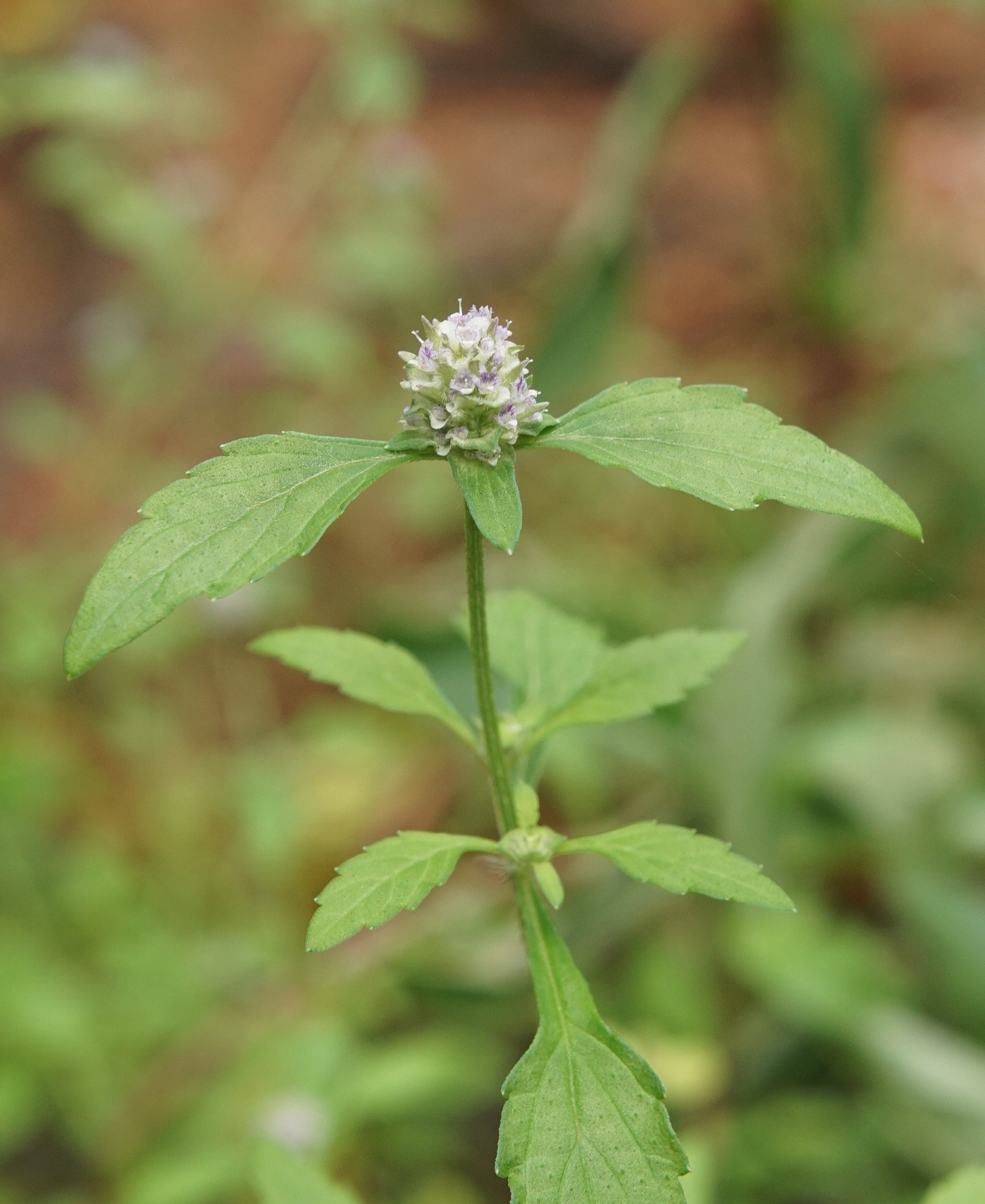

Scientific classification
- Kingdom: Plantae
- Clade: Tracheophytes
- Clade: Angiosperms
- Clade: Eudicots
- Clade: Asterids
- Order: Lamiales
- Family: Lamiaceae
- Genus: Platostoma
- Species: P. hispidum

Binomial name
- Platostoma hispidum (L.) A.J.Paton

Synonyms
- Ocimum capitatum; Prunella indica; Acrocephalus hispidus (L.) Nicolson&Sivad.

= Platostoma hispidum =

Species of plant of the mint family

Platostoma hispidum is a species of flowering plant in the mint family, Lamiaceae. It is found in Kashmir to Nepal, Bhutan, Western Ghats, Indo-China, and Malaysia. It is commonly known as hairy gomphrena.

== Synonyms ==
=== Homotypic ===
  - Acrocephalus hispidus Nicolson & Sivad., 1980.

=== Heterotypic ===
  - Acrocephalus blumei
  - Acrocephalus capitatus (Roth) Benth.
  - Acrocephalus capitellatus (L.f.) Druce
  - Acrocephalus indicus (Burm.f.) Kunze,
  - Acrocephalus indicus var. spicatus (C.B.Rob.) Keng
  - Acrocephalus scariosus Benth.
  - Acrocephalus spicatus C.B.Rob.
  - Lumnitzera capitata (Roth) Spreng.,
  - Mentha cephalotes B.Heyne ex Steud.,
  - Ocimum acrocephalum
  - Ocimum capitatum Roth
  - Ocimum capitellatum L.f.
  - Prunella indica Burm.f.
