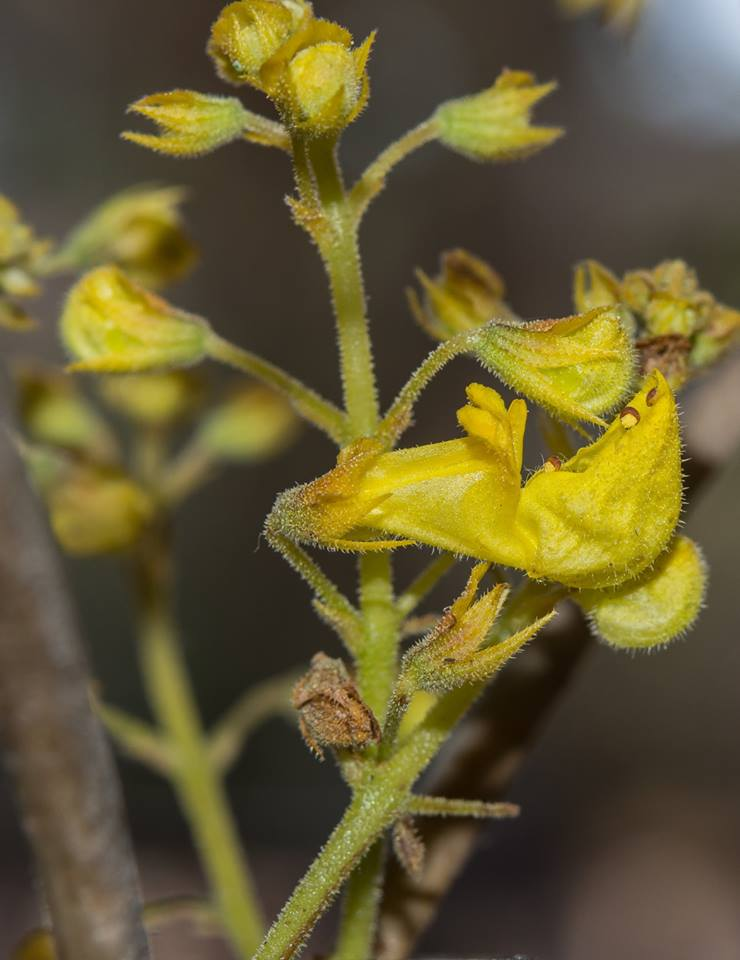

Scientific classification
- Kingdom: Plantae
- Clade: Tracheophytes
- Clade: Angiosperms
- Clade: Eudicots
- Clade: Asterids
- Order: Lamiales
- Family: Lamiaceae
- Genus: Coleus
- Species: C. esculentus

Binomial name
- Coleus esculentus (N.E.Br.) G.Taylor

Synonyms
- Plectranthus esculentus N.E.Br.; Plectranthus floribundus N.E.Br.; Englerastrum floribundum (N.E.Br.) T.C.E.Fr.; Coleus floribundus (N.E.Br.) Robyns & Lebrun, nom. illeg., non C. floribundus Baker; Plectranthus floribundus var. longipes N.E.Br; Coleus floribundus var. longipes (N.E.Br.) Robyns & Lebrun; Coleus coppinii Heckel; Coleus dazo A.Chev.; Coleus langouassiensis A.Chev.

= Coleus esculentus =

Species of flowering plant

Coleus esculentus, synonym Plectranthus esculentus, also known as the kaffir potato or Livingstone potato, is a species of plant in the mint family Lamiaceae. It is indigenous to Africa, where it is grown for its edible tubers. It is more difficult to cultivate than Coleus rotundifolius, but able to give greater yields. Although the crop is similar to a potato, it is from the mint family, but it is still quite nutritious and useful. This crop can benefit many subsistence farmers since it is native, easy to grow, enjoying growing popularity in the market, and quite nutritious.

== Description ==
The species is a perennial dicot herb and a member of the mint family. It can grow to be as tall as 2 metres. Some of the branches on the base bend down and grow into the ground that then can form oblong tubers, which are the fleshy underground stems. These tubers are edible and nutritious, often eaten as a substitute for potato or sweet potato. Although they are rarely seen because the vegetative reproduction is predominant, the plant also has yellow flowers. These flowers are two-lipped, and are on the short and crowded branches. While the plant is in flower the stems are leafless. Coleus esculentus has fleshy leaves, on angular stems. These leaves have brown gland-dots underneath and toothed edges. The tubers of this plant are quite important since that is the part of the crop that is used for sale, and farmer exchange.

== History, geography and ethnography ==
Coleus esculentus is indigenous to southern tropical Africa. It was also first cultivated in the Upper Niger valley of the Hausaland in Nigeria and in the Central African Republic. Its cultivation has been largely displaced by the spread of cassava, which was introduced by the Portuguese to Africa from South America about 500 years ago. Although it is seen as a "lost crop" of Africa, and it was cultivated since prehistoric times, it is a crop that is still relevant today. The negative perception of this native crop has decreased the cultivation. However, the social stigma is starting to diminish and it has started being grown for the commercial markets in Africa. In French the crop's name is pomme de terre d’Afrique. In the Hausa language, it is called rizga.

== Cultivation ==
The tubers are the most useful part of Coleus esculentus for humans. These tubers are nutritious and easy to grow and are becoming easier to sell. The tubers can remain viable underground even when the plant is not able to produce leaves. Coleus esculentus can adapt well to various environmental conditions but does best in local environmental conditions where there has been a history of cultivation, such as Southern Africa. People who are trained in a community are able to manage the production of C. esculentus with little additional help.

The tubers have been planted in small plots of 10 by 10 m. In these small plots they were planted between young eucalyptus trees, using a mixed cropping system that had vegetables like amaranthus and cucurbits. They have also been intercropped with maize but that proved to be unsuccessful. Yields were lower when intercropped with maize.

Some cultivated tubers can weigh up to 1.8 kg. Yields of 2-6 tonnes per hectare have been reported. As well as yields of 70 tons per hectare were documented when the leaves could be harvested. They were harvested on a two-week interval and over a period of six weeks. Yields will depend on weather conditions and the various types of soil so it is important to keep these in mind.

=== Growing conditions ===
The species is propagated from tubers as well as small axillary bulbils. The tubers are planted in the spring when harvest can occur the following autumn. Coleus esculentus can be harvested 180–200 days after it has been planted. The ideal soil to grow this tuber is a pH of 6.5-7, with an annual rainfall of 700–1100 mm. The ideal photoperiod for the tubers is between 12.5 and 13 hours. C. esculentus is exceptionally hardy and grown quite easily in regions without frost.

=== Genetic stocks ===
The Millennium Seed Bank Project has stored six seed collections and the germination testing has been successful. The seeds are dried, packaged and kept at below zero temperature in a seed vault.

=== Consumption and use ===
The tubers of Coleus esculentus are often used like a potato or sweet potato. Directly after cultivation it can be boiled or roasted. The stems have been used to sweeten porridge. The leaves can be cooked in sauces as well. C. esculentus has been said to help with digestive problems also used to treat stomach ache and abdominal pain. It has also been used as anthelminthics.

=== Nutritional information ===
The fleshy underground stems, the tubers are the part of the plant that is consumed. This tuber crop is considered to be superior to other tuber crops in terms of its food value. In 100g there is:

- Total carbohydrates 80 g
- Crude protein level: 13 g
- Total lipids: 0.6 g
- Calcium 140 mg
- Iron 50 mg
- Vitamin A 0.17 mg

It is rich in carbohydrates, vitamin A, minerals, and essential amino acids. Coleus esculentus has contributed significantly to rural diets.

=== Economics ===
In 2001-2002 farmers were able to sell 250 g of this crop for up to rand 5 (US$1), which is higher than the price of an Irish potato. Communities can also sell the cooked leaves for rand 7 (US$1.30). There is a cash demand for Coleus esculentus, but it is typically exchanged between neighbours and friends.
