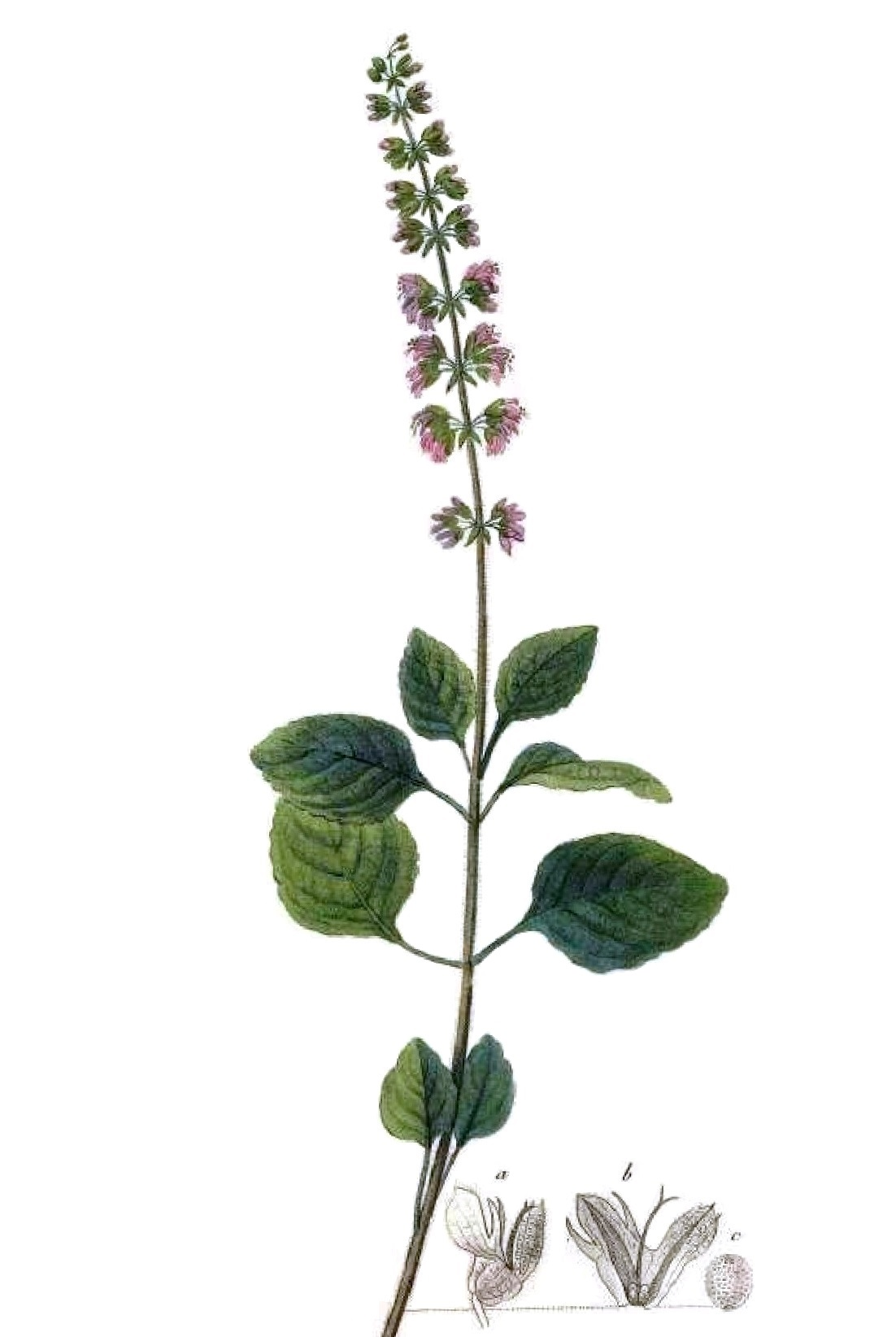
- Platostoma africanum

Scientific classification
- Kingdom: Plantae
- Clade: Embryophytes
- Clade: Tracheophytes
- Clade: Spermatophytes
- Clade: Angiosperms
- Clade: Eudicots
- Clade: Asterids
- Order: Lamiales
- Family: Lamiaceae
- Subfamily: Nepetoideae
- Tribe: Ocimeae
- Genus: Platostoma; P.Beauv. (1818)

Species
- 51; see text

Synonyms
- Acrocephalus Benth. (1829); Ceratanthus F.Muell. ex G.Taylor (1936); Geniosporum Wall. ex Benth. (1830); Hemsleia Kudô (1929); Limniboza R.E.Fr. (1916); Mesona Blume (1826); Nosema Prain (1904); Octomeron Robyns (1943)

= Platostoma =

Genus of flowering plants

Platostoma is a genus of flowering plants in the mint family, Lamiaceae, first described as a genus in 1818. It is native to tropical parts of Africa, southern Asia, Papuasia, and Australia. Mesona and Acrocephalus has been known as its synonyms.

A widely consumed species in this genus is Platostoma palustre (synonyms Mesona chinensis, M. elegans, and M. procumbens), or xiancao (仙草) in Mandarin, sian-chháu (仙草) in Taiwanese, leung fun cho (涼粉草) in Cantonese, sương sáo in Vietnamese, and cincau in Indonesian and Malay. It is eaten as a snack in drinks, or set as a gel and served as a grass jelly.

In Indonesia the Platostoma palustre leaf is used to make a black jelly; there is also an instant powder variety available.

== Description ==
Annual or perennial herbs with stems arising from a taproot, slender rhizome, or small woody rootstock; stems usually annual. Upper leaves and bracts often basally pale or coloured.

Inflorescence lax or condensed, with verticils of opposite cymes, the cymes usually bearing more than three flowers. Calyx round in cross-section; posterior lip 1- or 3-lobed, the posterior lobe decurrent or not; anterior lip 1–5-lobed. Corolla curved, dorsally gibbous or spurred; posterior lip 3- or 4-lobed and ascending, anterior lobe horizontal. Stamens four, declinate or spreading, with filaments basally swollen or bearing a flattened basal appendage, often pubescent. Style bifid.

Nutlets minutely striate or reticulate, apically pubescent or glabrous.

== Taxonomy ==
The genus is divided into three subgenera and several sections.

=== Subgenus Acrocephalus ===
Fruiting calyx throat open; posterior lobe rounded or shallowly emarginate, decurrent or not. Calyx lobes arranged as either a single posterior lobe with four anterior lobes, or three posterior lobes with two anterior lobes. Corolla dorsally gibbous. Stamens declinate; posterior filament attached near the midpoint of the corolla tube, inappendiculate.

==== Section Acrocephalus ====
Nutlets apically glabrous.

- Platostoma hispidum (L.) A.J. Paton
- Platostoma verbenifolium (Mukerjee) A.J. Paton
- Platostoma palniense (Mukerjee) A.J. Paton
- Platostoma axillaris (Benth.) A.J. Paton
- Platostoma elongatum (Benth.) A.J. Paton
- Platostoma menthoides (L.) A.J. Paton
- Platostoma tenellum (Benth.) A.J. Paton & Hedge

==== Section Heterodonta ====
Nutlets apically pubescent or tuberculate.

- Platostoma coloratum (D. Don) A.J. Paton
- Platostoma siamense (Murata) A.J. Paton
- Platostoma lanceolatum (Chermsir ex Murata) A.J. Paton
- Platostoma hildebrandtii (Vatke) A.J. Paton & Hedge
- Platostoma madagascariense (Benth.) A.J. Paton & Hedge
- Platostoma fastigiatum A.J. Paton & Hedge
- Platostoma laxiflorum A.J. Paton & Hedge
- Platostoma glomerulatum A.J. Paton & Hedge

=== Subgenus Octomeron ===
Fruiting calyx throat open. Posterior lobe rounded, shortly decurrent; lateral lobes closer to the posterior lobe than to the five lobes of the anterior lip, forming a 3-lobed posterior lip and a 5-lobed anterior lip. Corolla dorsally gibbous. Stamens declinate; posterior filament attached near the midpoint of the corolla tube, without appendages. Nutlets glabrous.

- Platostoma montanum (Robyns) A.J. Paton

=== Subgenus Platostoma ===
Fruiting calyx throat closed. Posterior lobe acute, rounded or emarginate, decurrent or not. Lateral lobes usually close to the posterior lobe, forming a 3-lobed posterior lip and a 1-lobed anterior lip; less often midway between posterior and fused median anterior lobes or much reduced. Corolla dorsally gibbous or spurred. Stamens declinate or spreading; posterior filament attached near the base or midpoint of the tube, appendiculate or not. Nutlets apically glabrous.

==== Section Platostoma ====
Posterior calyx lobe rounded and shortly decurrent; lateral lobes much reduced and close to the posterior lobe, giving a 1-lobed posterior lip and a 1-lobed anterior lip. Corolla dorsally gibbous. Stamens declinate; posterior filament inappendiculate, attached near the midpoint of the corolla tube. Nutlets apically rounded.

- Platostoma africanum P. Beauv.
- Platostoma leptochilon Robyns
- Platostoma gabonense A.J. Paton
- Platostoma denticulatum Robyns

==== Section Ceratanthus ====
Posterior calyx lobe rounded and shortly decurrent; lateral lobes variable, either much reduced giving a 1-lobed posterior lip and a 1-lobed anterior lip, more prominent and close to the posterior lobe giving a 3-lobed posterior lip and a 1-lobed anterior lip, or more rarely positioned midway giving a 1-lobed posterior lip and a 3-lobed anterior lip. Corolla usually spurred, sometimes dorsally gibbous. Stamens declinate; posterior filaments inappendiculate, attached near the base of the corolla tube. Nutlets apically rounded.

- Platostoma intermedium A.J. Paton
- Platostoma longicorne (E Muell.) A.J. Paton
- Platostoma annamense (G. Taylor) A.J. Paton
- Platostoma becquerellii Suddee & A.J. Paton
- Platostoma stoloniferum (G. Taylor) A.J. Paton
- Platostoma calcaratum (Hemsl.) A.J. Paton
- Platostoma garrettii (Craib) A.J. Paton
- Platostoma ocimoides (G. Taylor) A.J. Paton
- Platostoma ovatum Suddee, A.J. Paton & J. Parn.
- Platostoma kerrii Suddee & A.J. Paton

==== Section Limniboza ====
Posterior calyx lobe acute and not decurrent; lateral lobes close to the posterior lobe, forming a 3-lobed posterior lip and a 1-lobed anterior lip. Corolla dorsally gibbous. Stamens declinate or spreading, with inappendiculate posterior filaments attached near the midpoint of the corolla tube. Nutlets apically rounded.

- Platostoma coeruleum (R.E. Fr.) A.J. Paton
- Platostoma dilungense (Lisowski & Mielcarek) A.J. Paton
- Platostoma lisowskianum (Bamps) A.J. Paton
- Platostoma rotundifolium (Briq.) A.J. Paton
- Platostoma strictum (Hiern) A.J. Paton
- Platostoma thymiflorum (Benth.) A.J. Paton & Hedge

==== Section Mesona ====
Posterior calyx lobe acute, rounded or emarginate, decurrent or not; lateral lobes close to the posterior lobe, forming a 3-lobed posterior lip and a 1-lobed anterior lip. Corolla dorsally gibbous. Stamens declinate; posterior filaments usually appendiculate, rarely inappendiculate, and attached near the midpoint of the corolla tube. Nutlets apically acute.

- Platostoma palustre (Blume) A.J. Paton
- Platostoma chinense (Benth.) A.J. Paton
- Platostoma taylorii (Doan) A.J. Paton
- Platostoma tectum A.J. Paton
- Platostoma fimbriatum A.J. Paton
- Platostoma clausum (Merr.) A.J. Paton
- Platostoma cochinchinense (Lour.) A.J. Paton
- Platostoma mekongense Suddee
- Platostoma cambodgense Suddee & A.J.Paton
- Platostoma rubrum Suddee & A.J. Paton
- Platostoma grandiflorum Suddee & A.J. Paton
- Platostoma tridechii Suddee
- Platostoma albiflorum Suddee, A.J. Paton & J.Parn.
- Platostoma busbanianum Suddee, A.J. Paton & J.Parn.
- Platostoma hemratianum Suddee, Puudjaa & Kiewbang
- Platostoma parnellianum Suddee, A.J. Paton & Kiewbang
