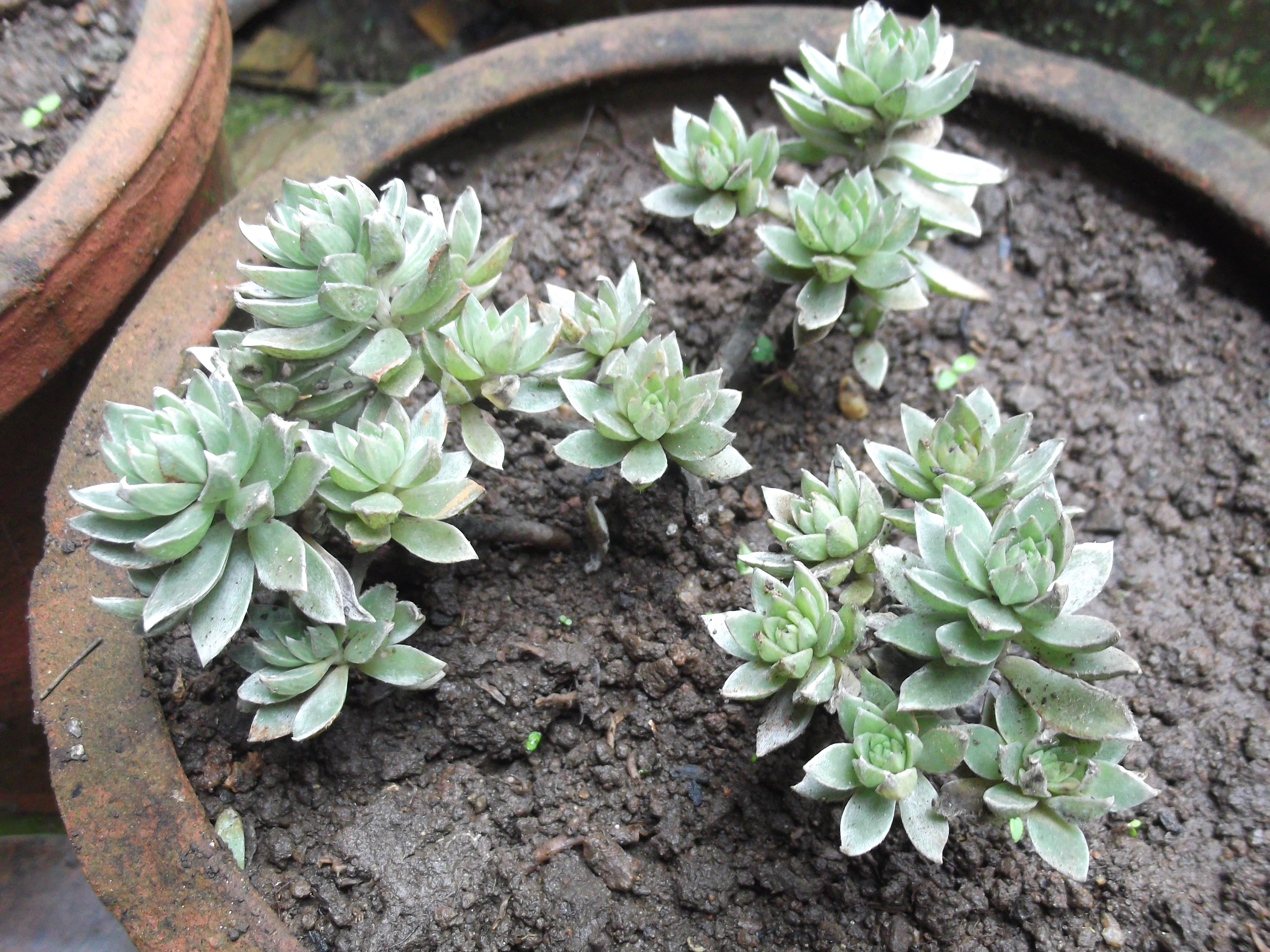

Scientific classification
- Kingdom: Plantae
- Clade: Tracheophytes
- Clade: Angiosperms
- Clade: Eudicots
- Clade: Asterids
- Order: Lamiales
- Family: Lamiaceae
- Genus: Coleus
- Species: C. argenteus

Binomial name
- Coleus argenteus (Gamble) A.J.Paton

= Coleus argenteus =

Shrub

Coleus argenteus is a stout, herbaceous plant up to 30 cm tall, belonging to the Lamiaceae family and known locally as sheethakkoraali. This species is endemic to South India, primarily found in rocky areas of evergreen forests within locations like Idukki and Palakkad. It is distinctively characterized by its silvery white tomentose (densely hairy) stem and small, sessile, obovate leaves. The plant flowers and fruits between December and February, producing small, yellowish corollas arranged in cylindrical spikes. The current accepted name is Coleus argenteus, having been transferred from its synonym, Anisochilus argenteus Gamble, in 2019.
