= C. officinalis =

C. officinalis may refer to:

- Calendula officinalis, a garden plant species
- Cinchona officinalis, a tree species native to the Amazon Rainforest
- Cochlearia officinalis, a flowering plant species
- Corallina officinalis, a calcareous red seaweed species
- Cyathula officinalis, a plant species native to the China

== See also ==
- Officinalis
