= A. officinalis =

A. officinalis may refer to:

- Althaea officinalis, a mallow species
- Anchusa officinalis, the common bugloss or alkanet, a plant species
- Asparagus officinalis, a spring vegetable and a flowering perennial plant species native to most of Europe, northern Africa and western Asia
- Avicennia officinalis, a mangrove species

== See also ==
- Officinalis
