= V. officinalis =

V. officinalis may refer to:

- Verbena officinalis, a perennial herb species native to Europe
- Veronica officinalis, a plant species native to Europe and western Asia

== See also ==
- Officinalis
