= S. officinalis =

S. officinalis may refer to:

- Salvia officinalis, the common sage, a plant species
- Sanguisorba officinalis, the great burnet, a plant species native throughout the cooler regions of the Northern Hemisphere in Europe, northern Asia and northern North America
- Saponaria officinalis, the common soapwort, a perennial plant species native from Europe to western Siberia
- Sepia officinalis, the common cuttlefish or European common cuttlefish, a cuttlefish species native to the Mediterranean Sea, North Sea and Baltic Sea
- Stachys officinalis, the purple betony, bishopwort, lousewort, wild hop, wood betony or bishop's wort, a perennial grassland herb species found in most of Europe, western Asia and North Africa
- Styrax officinalis, a shrub species native to southern Europe and the Middle East

== See also ==
- Officinalis
