= P. sativa =

P. sativa may refer to:

- Pastinaca sativa, the parsnip, a root vegetable species related to the carrot
- Pinus sativa, a synonym for Pinus pinea, the stone pine, a tree species

== See also ==
- Sativa
