= P. officinalis =

P. officinalis may refer to:

- Parietaria officinalis, a plant species
- Pulmonaria officinalis, an evergreen perennial plant species

== See also ==
- Officinalis
