= C. sativa =

C. sativa may refer to:

- Camelina sativa, the gold-of-pleasure or false flax, a flowering plant species native to Northern Europe and to Central Asia
- Cannabis sativa, an annual plant species better known as marijuana
- Castanea sativa, the sweet chestnut, a tree species known for its edible seeds originally native to southeastern Europe and Asia Minor

== See also ==
- Sativa
