= M. officinalis =

M. officinalis may refer to:

- Magnolia officinalis, a plant species native to the mountains and valleys of China
- Melilotus officinalis, a legume species
- Melissa officinalis, the lemon balm, a plant species

== See also ==
- Officinalis
