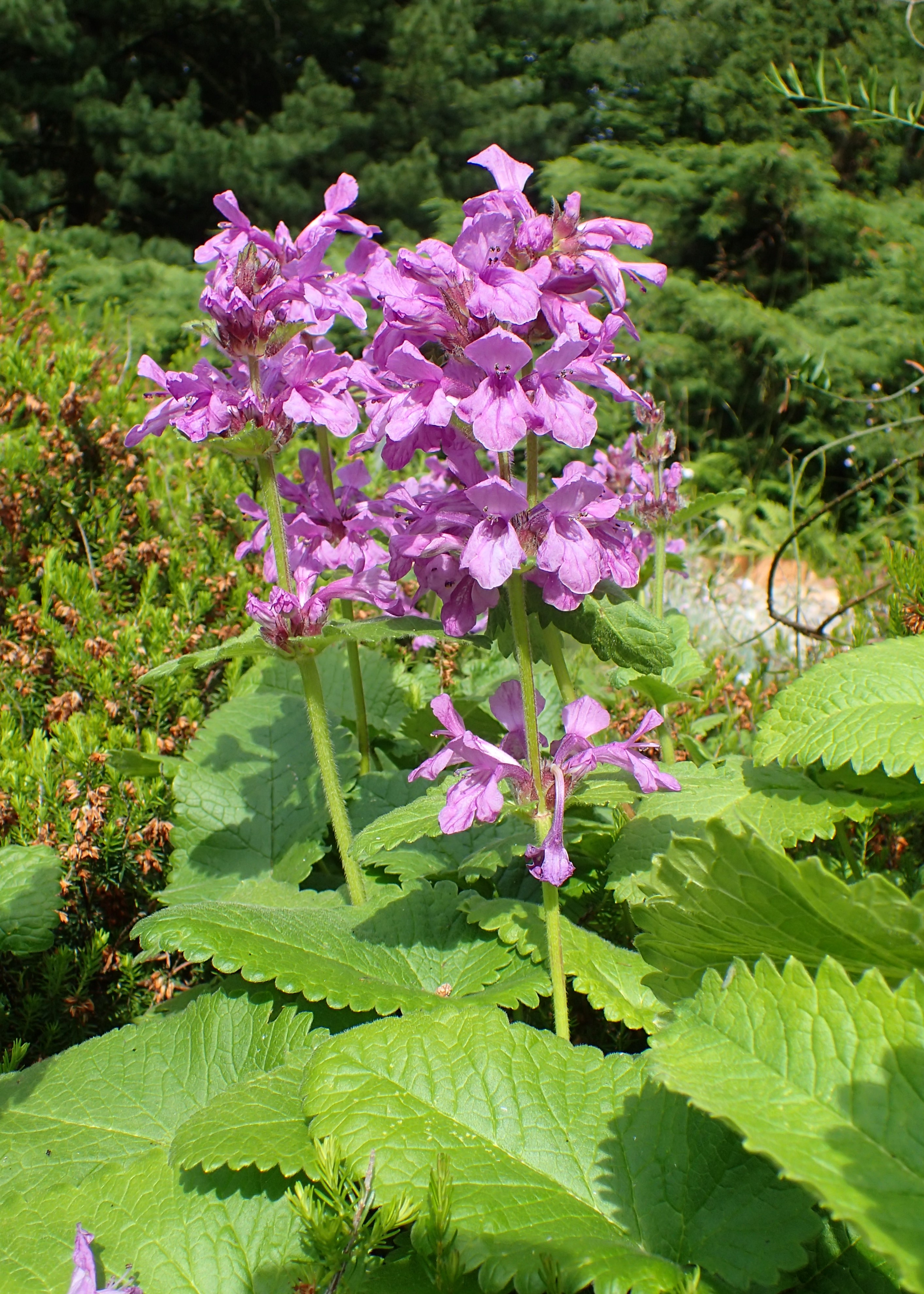
- In bloom
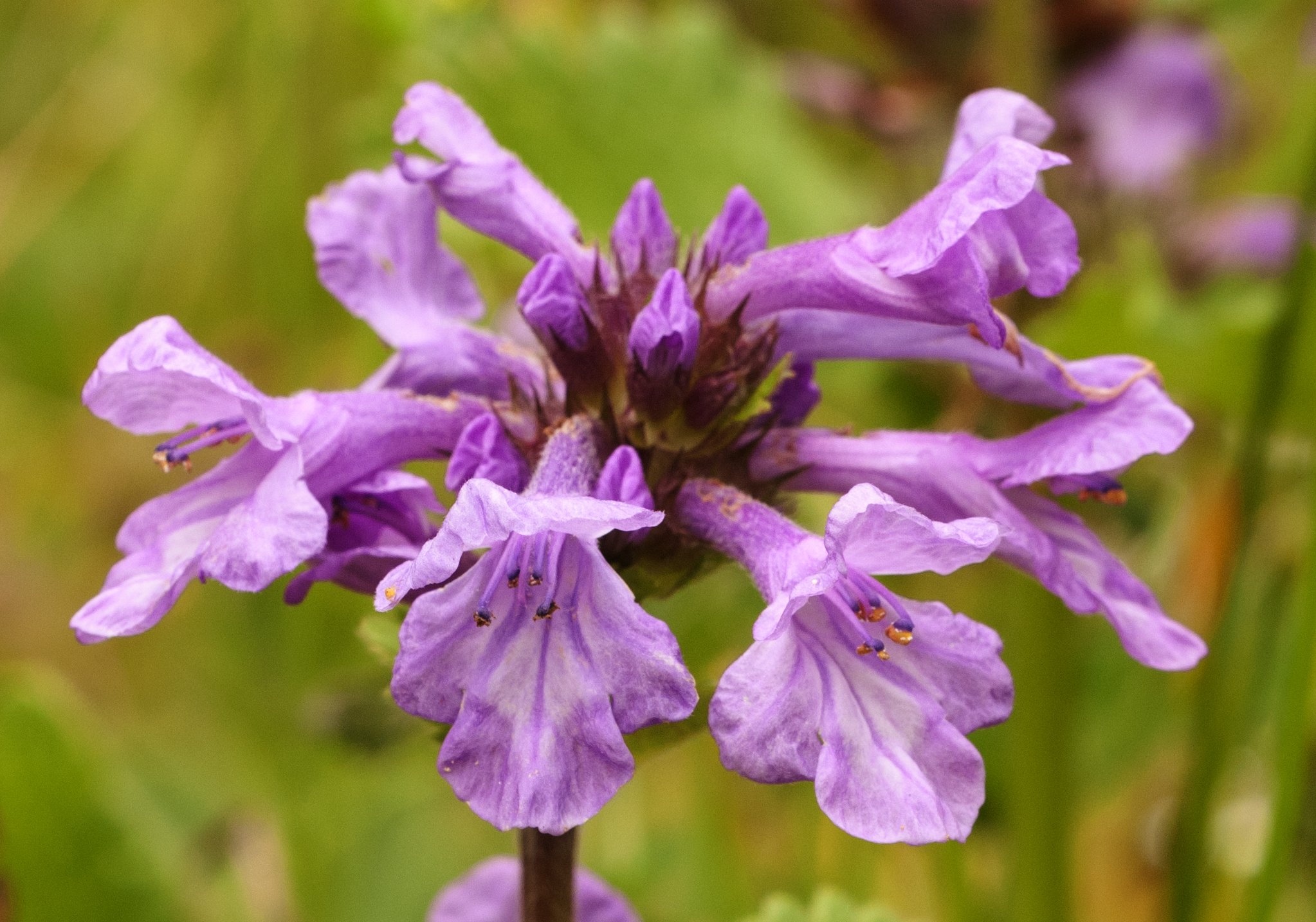
- Close-up of flowers

Scientific classification
- Kingdom: Plantae
- Clade: Tracheophytes
- Clade: Angiosperms
- Clade: Eudicots
- Clade: Asterids
- Order: Lamiales
- Family: Lamiaceae
- Genus: Betonica
- Species: B. macrantha

Binomial name
- Betonica macrantha K.Koch

Synonyms
- List: Betonica grandiflora Stephan ex Willd.; Betonica rosea Prien. ex Hornem.; Clinopodium grandiflorum Gueldenst. ex M.Bieb.; Stachys grandiflora (Stephan ex Willd.) Benth.; Stachys macrantha (K.Koch) Stearn

= Betonica macrantha =

Species of flowering plant

Betonica macrantha, formerly Stachys macrantha, known as big betony, is a species of flowering plant in the mint family Lamiaceae. It is native to the Caucasus, northeastern Turkey, and northwestern Iran. Growing to 60 cm (24 in) tall by 30 cm (12 in) broad, it is an erect herbaceous perennial with scalloped cordate leaves. Spikes of hooded purplish-pink flowers are borne throughout summer.

The Latin specific epithet macrantha means "large-flowered".

The cultivars 'Robusta', 'Superba', and 'Violacea' have gained the Royal Horticultural Society's Award of Garden Merit.
