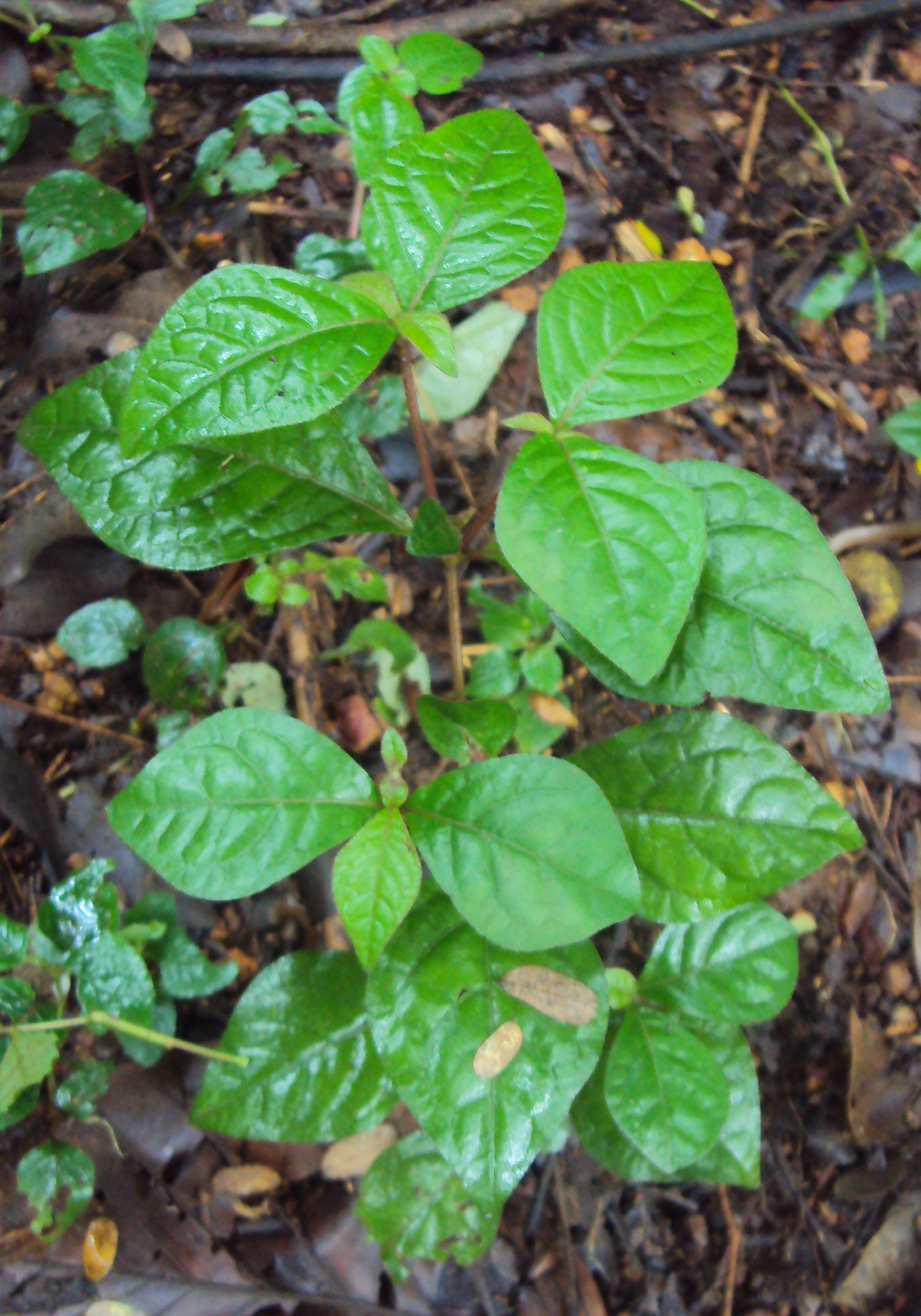
- Cyanthula prostrata leaves

Scientific classification
- Kingdom: Plantae
- Clade: Tracheophytes
- Clade: Angiosperms
- Clade: Eudicots
- Order: Caryophyllales
- Family: Amaranthaceae
- Subfamily: Amaranthoideae
- Genus: Cyathula; Blume

Species
- 42; see text

Synonyms
- Nelsia Schinz; Polyscalis Wall.; Sericocomopsis Schinz

= Cyathula =

Genus of flowering plants

Cyathula is a genus of medicinal and ornamental plants in the family Amaranthaceae. They are distributed in subtropical and tropical Africa, Asia, Oceania and the Americas.

== Species ==
42 species are accepted.

- Cyathula achyranthoides (Kunth) Moq.
- Cyathula angolensis (Bamps) Di Vincenzo, Berends., Wondafr. & Borsch
- Cyathula biflora Schinz
- Cyathula braunii Gilg ex Schinz
- Cyathula capitata Moq.
- Cyathula carsonii (Baker) Di Vincenzo, Berends., Wondafr. & Borsch
- Cyathula ceylanica Hook.f.
- Cyathula confusa (C.C.Towns.) Di Vincenzo, Berends., Wondafr. & Borsch
- Cyathula coriacea Schinz
- Cyathula cylindrica Moq.
- Cyathula divulsa Suess.
- Cyathula elegantissima (Schinz) Di Vincenzo, Berends., Wondafr. & Borsch
- Cyathula erinacea Schinz
- Cyathula fernando-poensis Suess. & Friedrich
- Cyathula heudelotii (Moq.) Di Vincenzo, Berends., Wondafr. & Borsch
- Cyathula hildebrandtii (Schinz) Di Vincenzo, Berends., Wondafr. & Borsch
- Cyathula humbertiana Cavaco
- Cyathula involucrata (Moq.) Di Vincenzo, Berends., Wondafr. & Borsch
- Cyathula lanceolata Schinz
- Cyathula madagascariensis Cavaco
- Cyathula meruensis (Suess.) Di Vincenzo, Berends., Wondafr. & Borsch
- Cyathula mollis C.C.Towns.
- Cyathula natalensis Sond.
- Cyathula obtusifolia Cavaco
- Cyathula officinalis K.C.Kuan – kuan, radix cyathula
- Cyathula perrieriana Cavaco
- Cyathula pobeguinii Jacq.-Fél.
- Cyathula polycephala Baker
- Cyathula porphyrargyrea (Suess. & Overkott) Di Vincenzo, Berends., Wondafr. & Borsch
- Cyathula prostrata (L.) Blume – prostrate pastureweed
- Cyathula quadrangula (Engl.) Di Vincenzo, Berends., Wondafr. & Borsch
- Cyathula ramulosa (Hiern) Di Vincenzo, Berends., Wondafr. & Borsch
- Cyathula richardsiae (Suess.) Di Vincenzo, Berends., Wondafr. & Borsch
- Cyathula rubrolutea (Lopr.) Di Vincenzo, Berends., Wondafr. & Borsch
- Cyathula semirosulata Masam.
- Cyathula sphaerocephala Baker
- Cyathula tomentosa (Schult.) Moq.
- Cyathula trichinioides (Suess.) Di Vincenzo, Berends., Wondafr. & Borsch
- Cyathula triuncinata Moq.
- Cyathula triuncinella Schinz
- Cyathula uncinulata (Schrad.) Schinz
- Cyathula welwitschii (Schinz) Di Vincenzo, Berends., Wondafr. & Borsch
