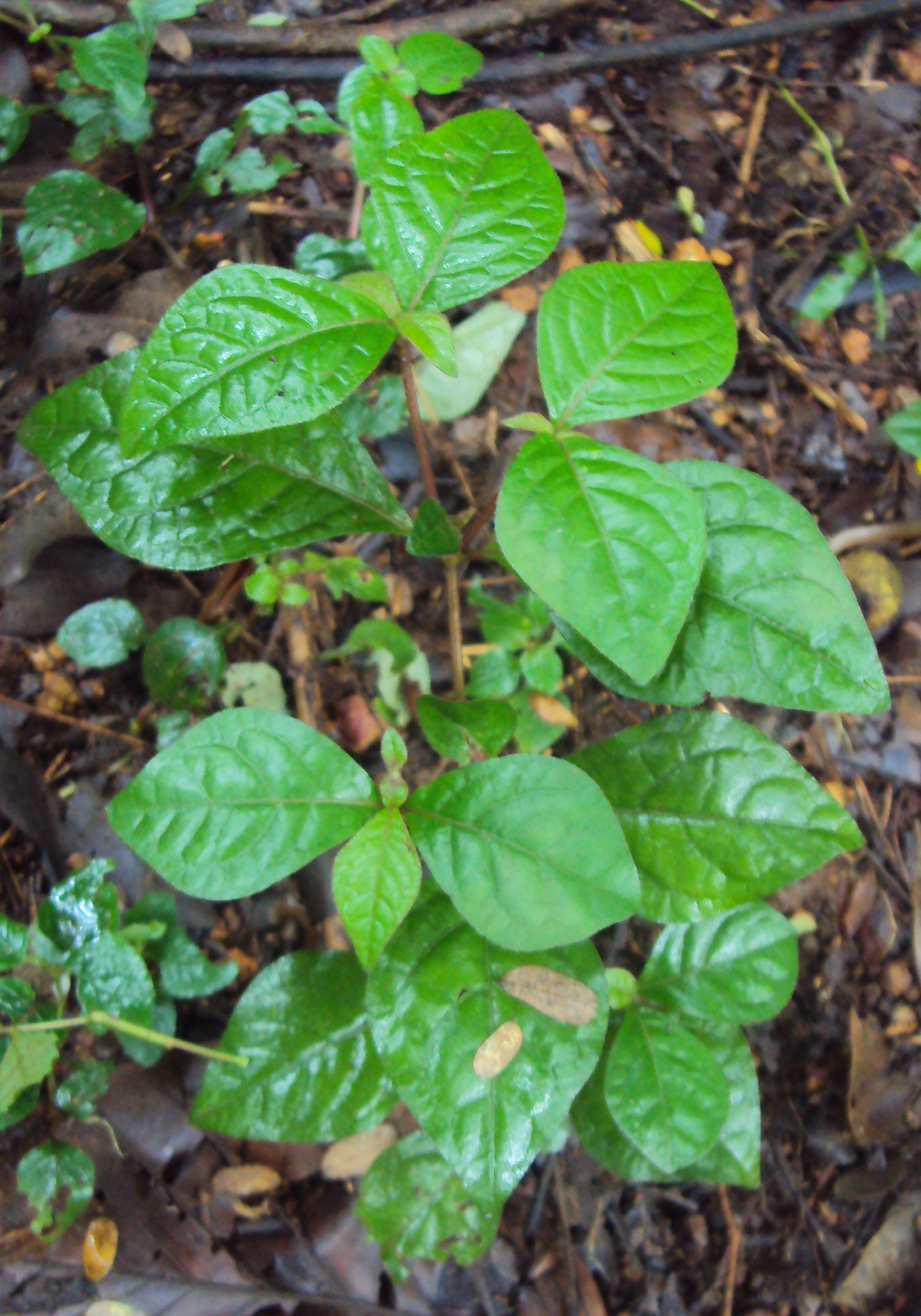
- Leaves

Scientific classification
- Kingdom: Plantae
- Clade: Embryophytes
- Clade: Tracheophytes
- Clade: Angiosperms
- Clade: Eudicots
- Order: Caryophyllales
- Family: Amaranthaceae
- Genus: Cyathula
- Species: C. prostrata

Binomial name
- Cyathula prostrata (L.) Blume

Synonyms
- Synonyms list: Achyranthes prostrata L.; Desmochaeta prostrata (L.) DC.; Pupalia prostrata (L.) Mart.

= Cyathula prostrata =

Prostrate pastureweed

Species of plant

Cyathula prostrata, the prostrate pastureweed, is a perennial, prostrate, herbaceous plant distributed throughout the tropical and subtropical world.

== Etymology and names ==
=== Etymology ===
- Cyathula: sy-ATH-uh-la - small cup.
- prostrata: prost-RAY-tuh - prostrate.

=== Names ===
- Hindi: लाल चिरचिटा, romanized: laal chirchita
- Kannada: ನೆಲ ಉತ್ತರಾಣಿ, romanized: nela uttharaani, ರಕ್ತಪಮರ್ಗ (raktapamarga)
- Malayalam: ചെറുകടലാടി, romanized: cerukadalaadi
- Marathi: भुईअघाडा, romanized: bhuiaghādā
- Tamil: சிவப்பு நாயுருவி, romanized: civappu nayuruvi

== Distribution and habitat ==
=== Native range ===
- Africa: Benin, Burkina, The Gambia, Ghana, Guinea, Guinea-Bissau, Ivory Coast, Liberia, Mali, Nigeria, Senegal, Sierra Leone, Togo, Cameroon, Central African Republic, Congo, Equatorial Guinea, Gabon, Gulf of Guinea Is., Zaïre, Ethiopia, Sudan, Tanzania, Uganda, Angola, Malawi, Mozambique, Zambia, Zimbabwe, Madagascar.
- Asia-Temperate: China South-Central, China Southeast, Hainan, Taiwan.
- Asia-Tropical: Assam, Bangladesh, East Himalaya, India, Nepal, Sri Lanka, Cambodia, Laos, Myanmar, Thailand, Vietnam, Borneo, Jawa, Lesser Sunda Islands, Peninsular Malaysia, Maluku, Philippines, Singapore, Sulawesi, Sumatera, Bismarck Archipelago, New Guinea, Solomon Is.
- Pacific: Caroline Islands, Samoa.

=== Introduced range ===
Bolivia, Caroline Is., Cook Is., French Guiana, Guyana, Jamaica, Leeward Is., Marquesas, Mauritius, Puerto Rico, Réunion, Seychelles, Society Is., Suriname, Trinidad-Tobago, Tubuai Is., Venezuelan Antilles, Windward Is.

== Description ==
- Habit : Perennial, prostrate herbs.
- Leaves : Opposite, rhomboid, acute at both ends, thinly pubescent; petiolate.
- Inflorescence : Spike terminal, slender, solitary or in group of three.
- Flowers : In groups of 3-5 of which one perfect and others neuter; bracts and bracteoles similar, lanceolate, acuminate, pubescent; tepals 5, free, elliptic, acute, hooked awn like in neutor flowers.
- Androecium : Stamens 5, filaments united into a membranous truncate cup; staminodes membranous, alternate with stamens, fimbriate.
- Gynoecium : Ovary ovoid, style simple, stigma capitellate.
- Fruits : Achenes, obovoid, compressed, golden brown.
- Flowering and fruiting : September-April.

=== Varieties ===
- Cyathula prostrata var. prostrata
- Cyathula prostrata var. lancifolia - Philippines.
- Cyathula prostrata var. pedicellata - Tropical Africa.

== Uses and ecology ==
The plant is locally used as a medicine but also as a food and source of soap. It is also recorded as a larval host plant of Fulvous Pied Flat butterfly.
