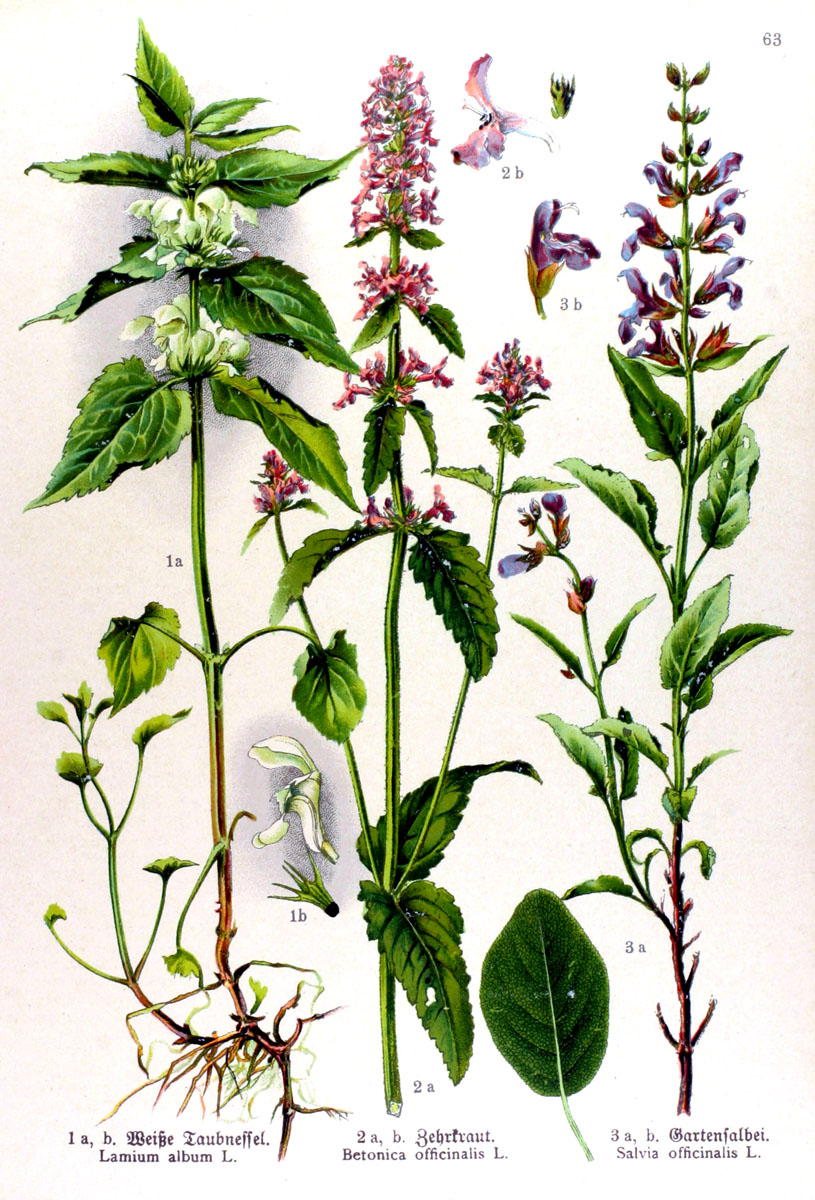
- Betonica officinalis

Scientific classification
- Kingdom: Plantae
- Clade: Tracheophytes
- Clade: Angiosperms
- Clade: Eudicots
- Clade: Asterids
- Order: Lamiales
- Family: Lamiaceae
- Genus: Betonica; L.

= Betonica =

Genus of flowering plants

Betonica is a genus of the plants in the family Lamiaceae.

Betonica was until recently usually included in the genus Stachys as a subgenus Stachys subg. Betonica (L.) Bhattacharjee, but was separated at genus rank from Stachys when a detailed morphological examination showed clear consistent differences in both the foliage and flowers, valid at a higher rank than the previous treatment as just a subgenus. This has been confirmed by genetic study, which shows Betonica is separate from Stachys and more closely related to the hemp-nettles Galeopsis.

== Species ==
Species include:

- Betonica alopecuros L.
- Betonica betoniciflora (Rupr. ex O.Fedtsch. & B.Fedtsch.) Sennikov
- Betonica brantii (Benth.) Boiss.
- Betonica bulgarica Degen & Nejceff
- Betonica hirsuta L.
- Betonica macrantha K.Koch
- Betonica nivea Steven
- Betonica officinalis L.
- Betonica orientalis L.
- Betonica scardica Griseb.
