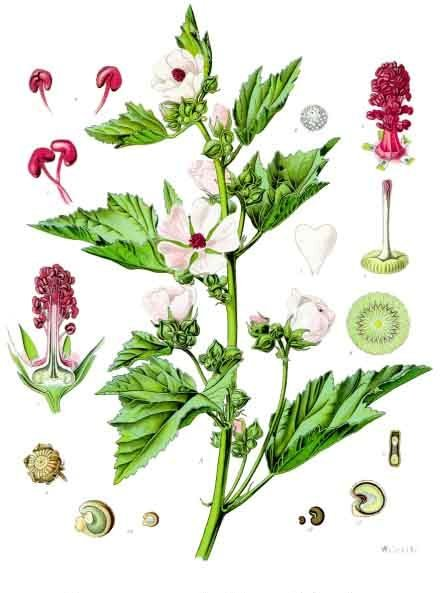

Scientific classification
- Kingdom: Plantae
- Clade: Tracheophytes
- Clade: Angiosperms
- Clade: Eudicots
- Clade: Rosids
- Order: Malvales
- Family: Malvaceae
- Genus: Althaea
- Species: A. officinalis

Binomial name
- Althaea officinalis L.

Synonyms
- Althaea kragujevacensis Pančić ex Diklić & Stevan.; Althaea micrantha Wiesb. ex Borbás; Althaea sublobata Stokes; Althaea taurinensis DC.; Althaea vulgaris Bubani; Malva althaea E.H.L.Krause; Malva maritima Salisb.; Malva officinalis (L.) Schimp. & Spenn. ex Schimp. & Spenn.

= Althaea officinalis =

Species of plant

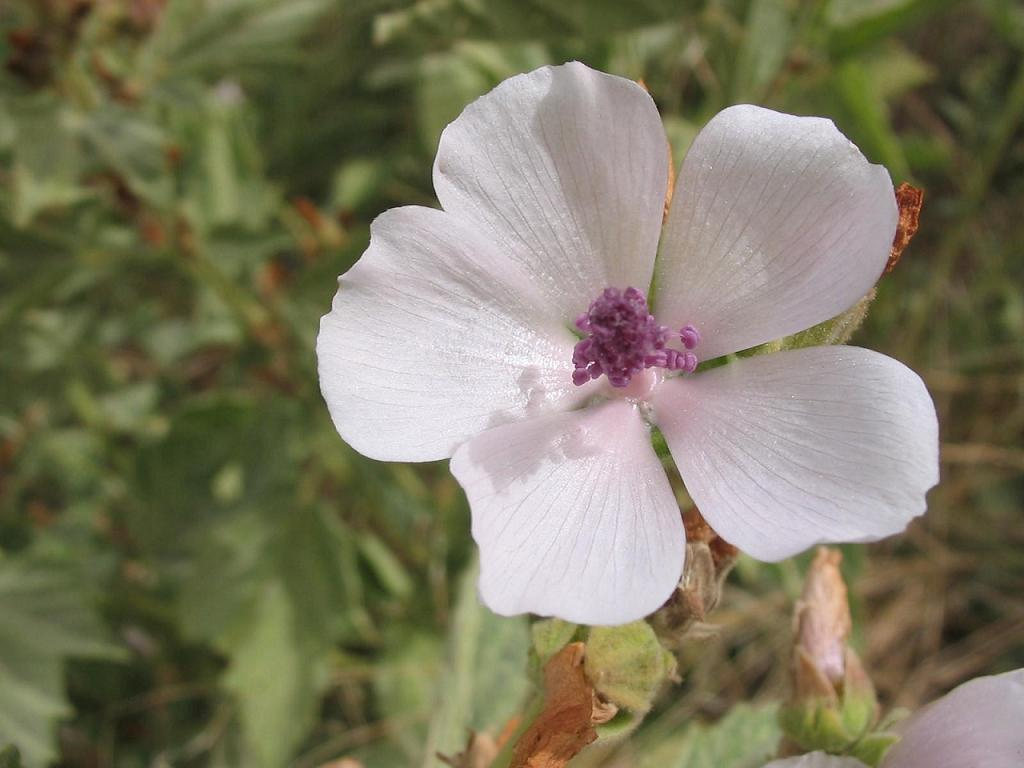
Marshmallow (Althaea officinalis)

Althaea officinalis, the marsh mallow or marshmallow, is a species of flowering plant indigenous to Europe, Western Asia and North Africa, which is used in herbalism and as an ornamental plant.

== Description ==
This herbaceous perennial grows to 180 cm (6 ft) tall and puts out only a few lateral branches. The whole plant is softly stellate-hairy, especially the leaves, which are broadly triangular to oval, often with 3–5 shallow lobes, irregularly toothed, with cordate to cuneate bases. Leaf size varies considerably, up to 100 mm (4 in) long, and 75 mm (3 in) wide. The leaves are arranged alternately along the stem, with no stipules, on petioles up to 45 mm (1.75 in).

The inflorescences occur in the leaf axils and at the top of the stem and consist of panicles of 1-many flowers. The flowers are actinomorphic with 5 lilac/pink petals up to 2 cm (0.8 in) long and 5 green sepals which are much shorter than the petals, and fused at the base. Below the petals is a cup-shaped epicalyx with 6–9 narrow, triangular lobes, half the length of the sepals. The purple stamens are united into a tube, the anthers kidney-shaped and one-celled. There is one style which protrudes above the stamen tube.

The flowers are in bloom during August and September, and are followed, as in other species of this order, by the flat, round fruit which are popularly called "cheeses". The whole fruit is a schizocarp, about 1 cm (0.4 in) in diameter, which splits into about 20 kidney-shaped mericarps (seeds) about 2 mm (0.08 in) long.

The common mallow is frequently called "marsh mallow" in colloquial terms, but the true marsh mallow is distinguished from all the other mallows growing in Great Britain by the numerous divisions of the outer calyx (six to nine cleft), by the hoary down which thickly clothes the stems and foliage, and by the numerous panicles of blush-coloured flowers, paler than the common mallow. The roots are perennial, thick, long and tapering, very tough and pliant, whitish yellow outside, white and fibrous within.

=== Phytochemicals ===
Chemical constituents include altheahexacosanyl lactone (n-hexacos-2-enyl-1,5-olide), 2β-hydroxycalamene (altheacalamene) and altheacoumarin glucoside (5,6-dihydroxycoumarin-5-dodecanoate-6β-D-glucopyranoside), along with the known phytoconstituents lauric acid, β-sitosterol and lanosterol.

== Uses ==
=== Ornamental ===
Marshmallows are used in gardening as ornamental plants.

=== Herbal medicine ===
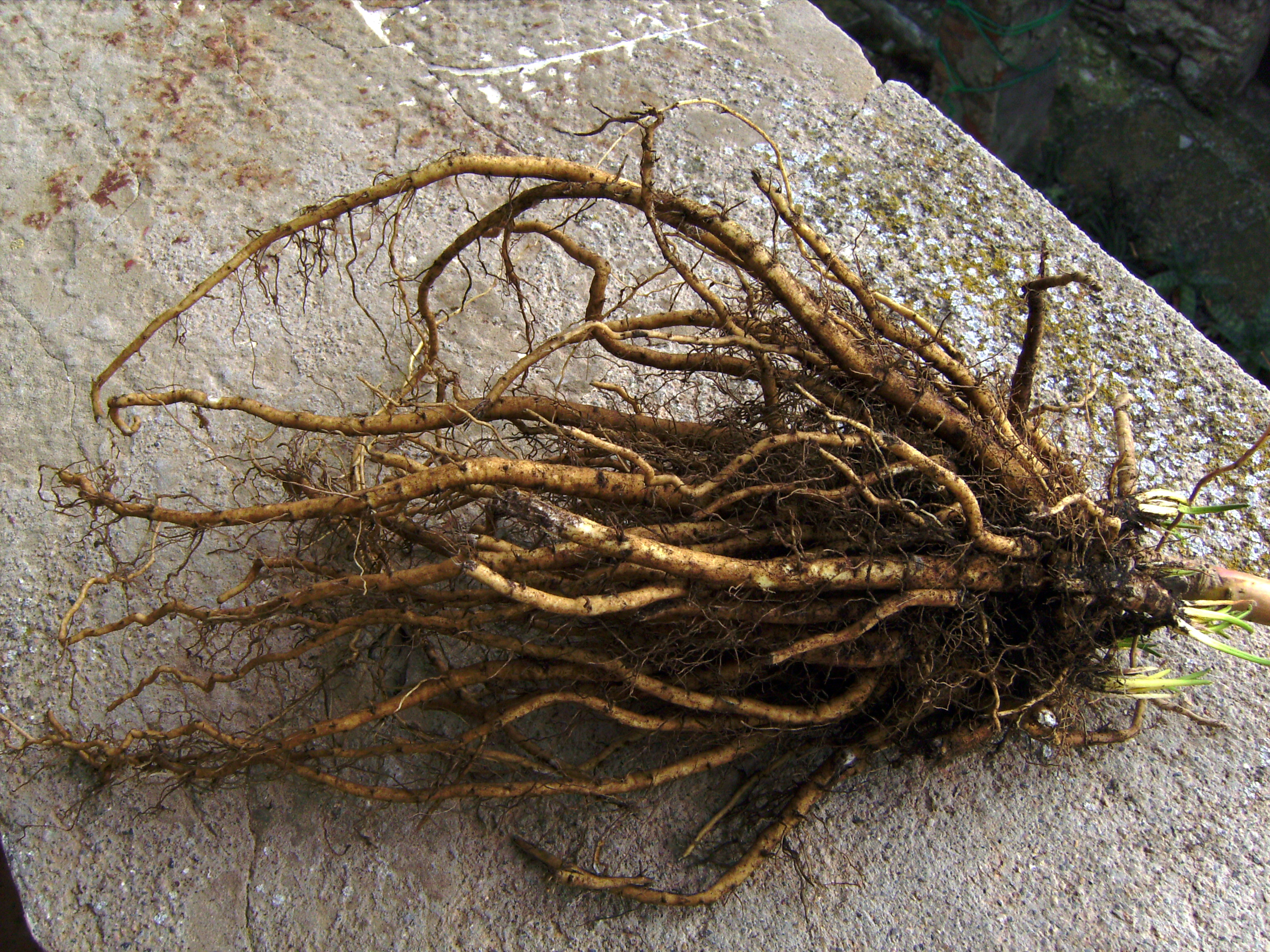
Marshmallow roots

The leaves, flowers and the root of A. officinalis (marshmallow) have been used in traditional herbal medicine. This use is reflected in the name of the genus, which comes from the Greek word althainein (ἀλθαίνειν), meaning "to heal". The Latin specific epithet officinalis indicates plants with some culinary or medicinal value.

Marshmallow is traditionally used as relief for irritation of mucous membranes, including use as a gargle for mouth and throat ulcers and gastric ulcers.

=== Culinary ===
The young leaves can be cooked. The flower buds can be pickled. When boiled first and fried with onions and butter, the roots are said to form a palatable dish. The roots can also be peeled, sliced, boiled and sweetened to make candy. Water used to boil any part of the plant can be used as an egg white substitute.

Historically, most of the mallows have been used as food, being mentioned by early classic writers. Mallow was a vegetable among the Romans; a dish of marshmallow was one of their delicacies.

== Botanical gallery ==
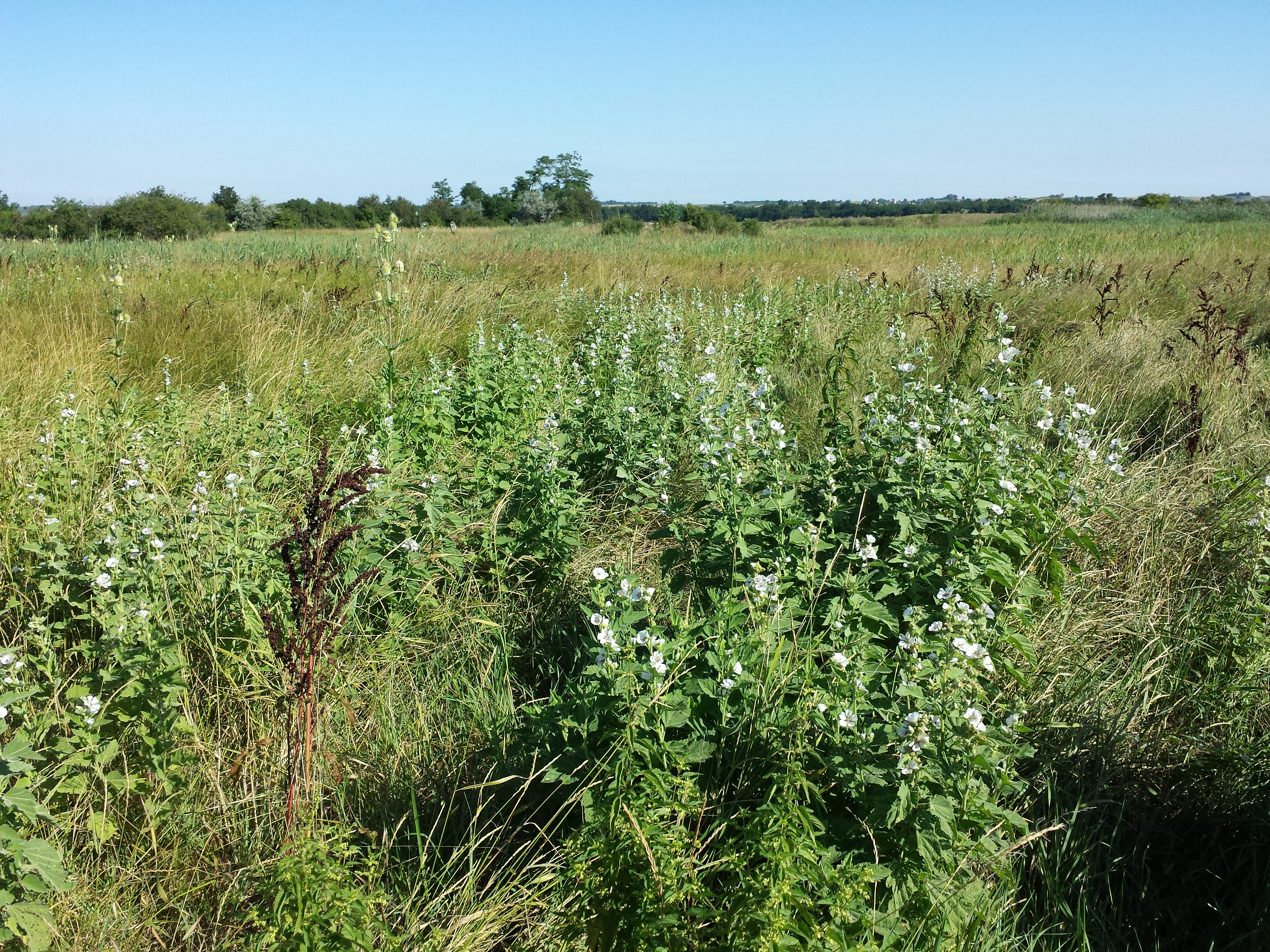
Typically upright and somewhat broad (Austria)

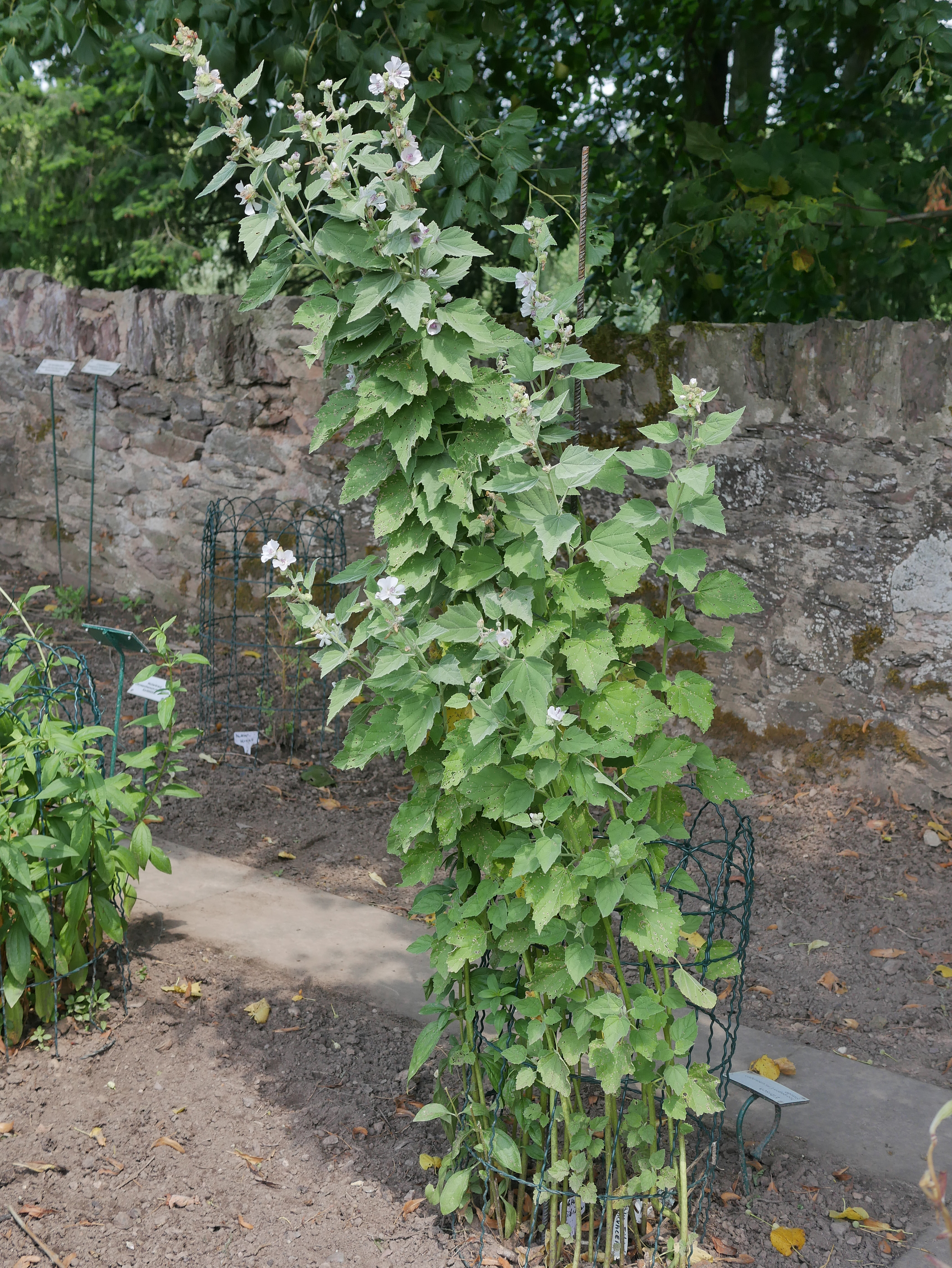
Very tall, narrow example (Germany)

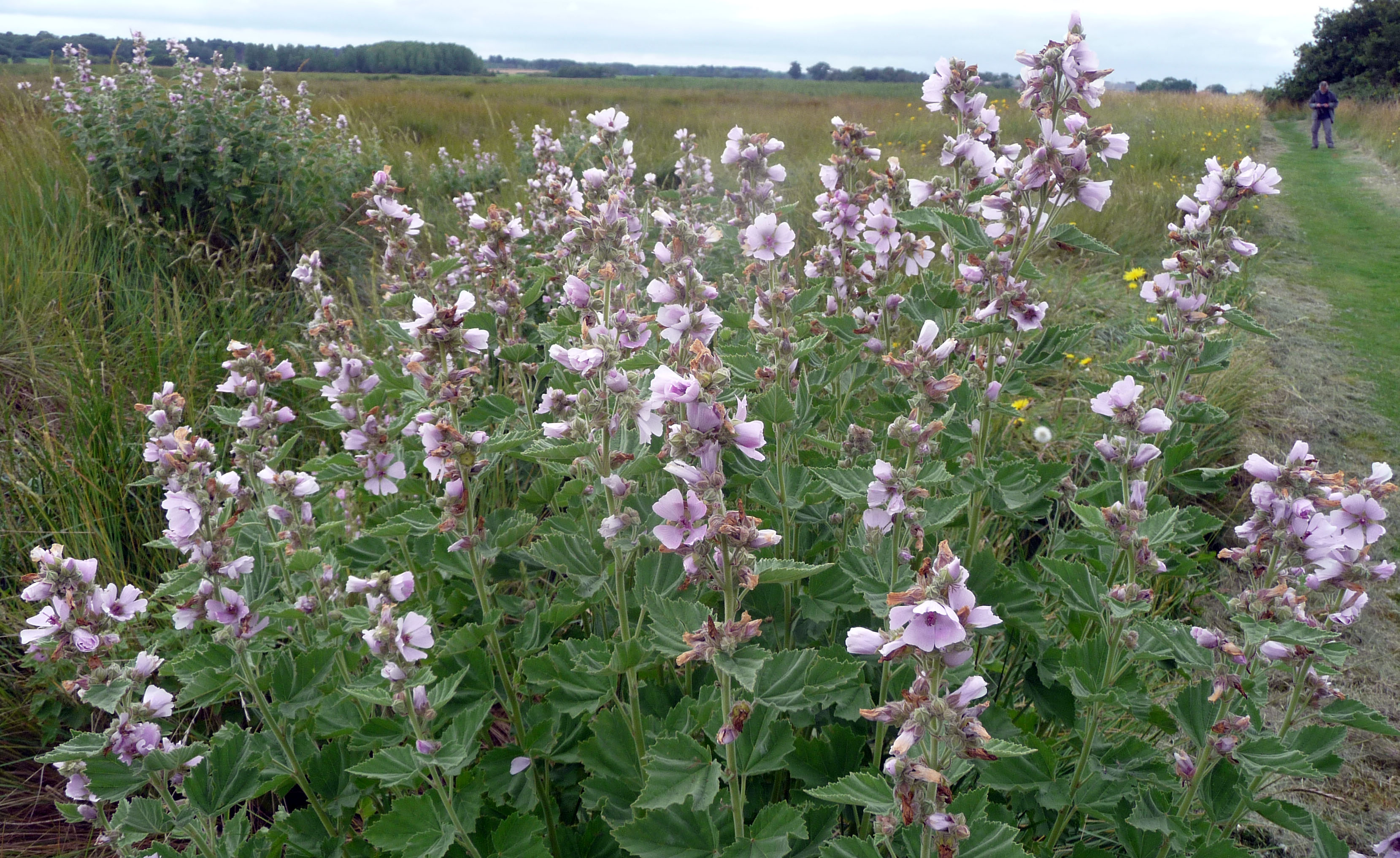
Typical appearance in flower, closer, showing pale clustered flowers with purple centres (England)

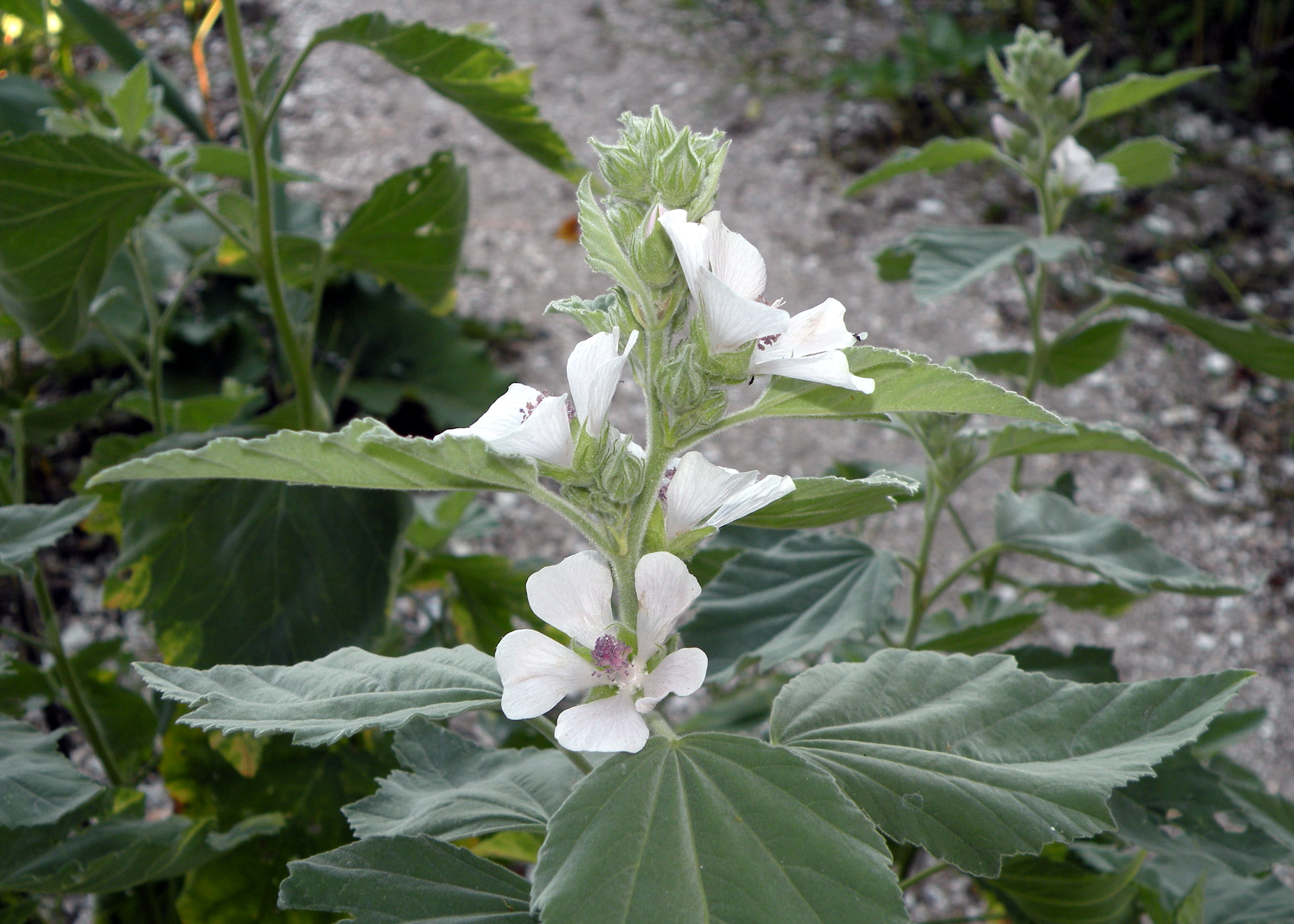
Pale clustered flowers with purple centres and velvety leaves with recessed veins

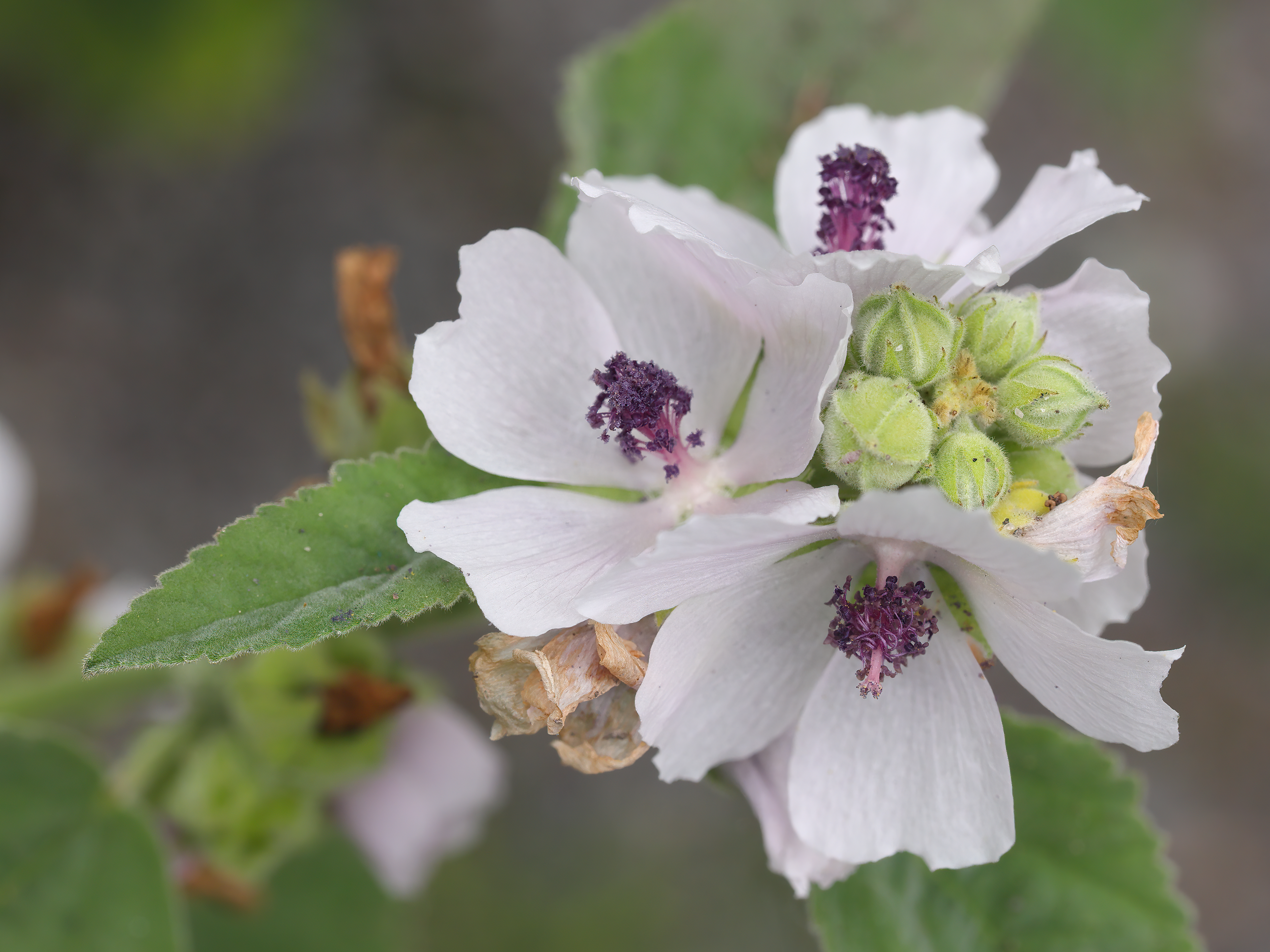
Flower cluster showing purple anthers and stigmas (Canada)

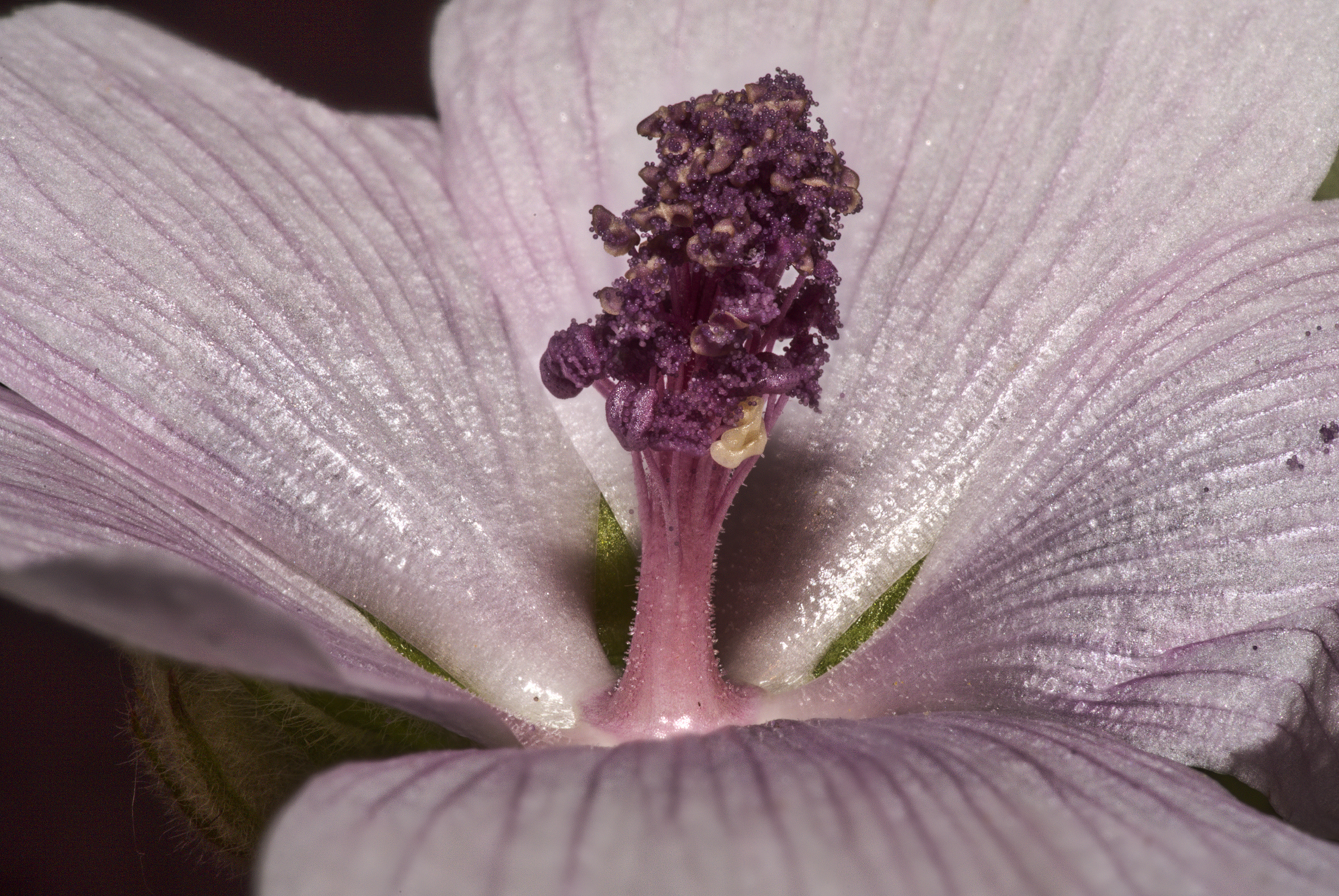
Filaments join into a column, showing purple anthers and (when zoomed) purple pollen spheres

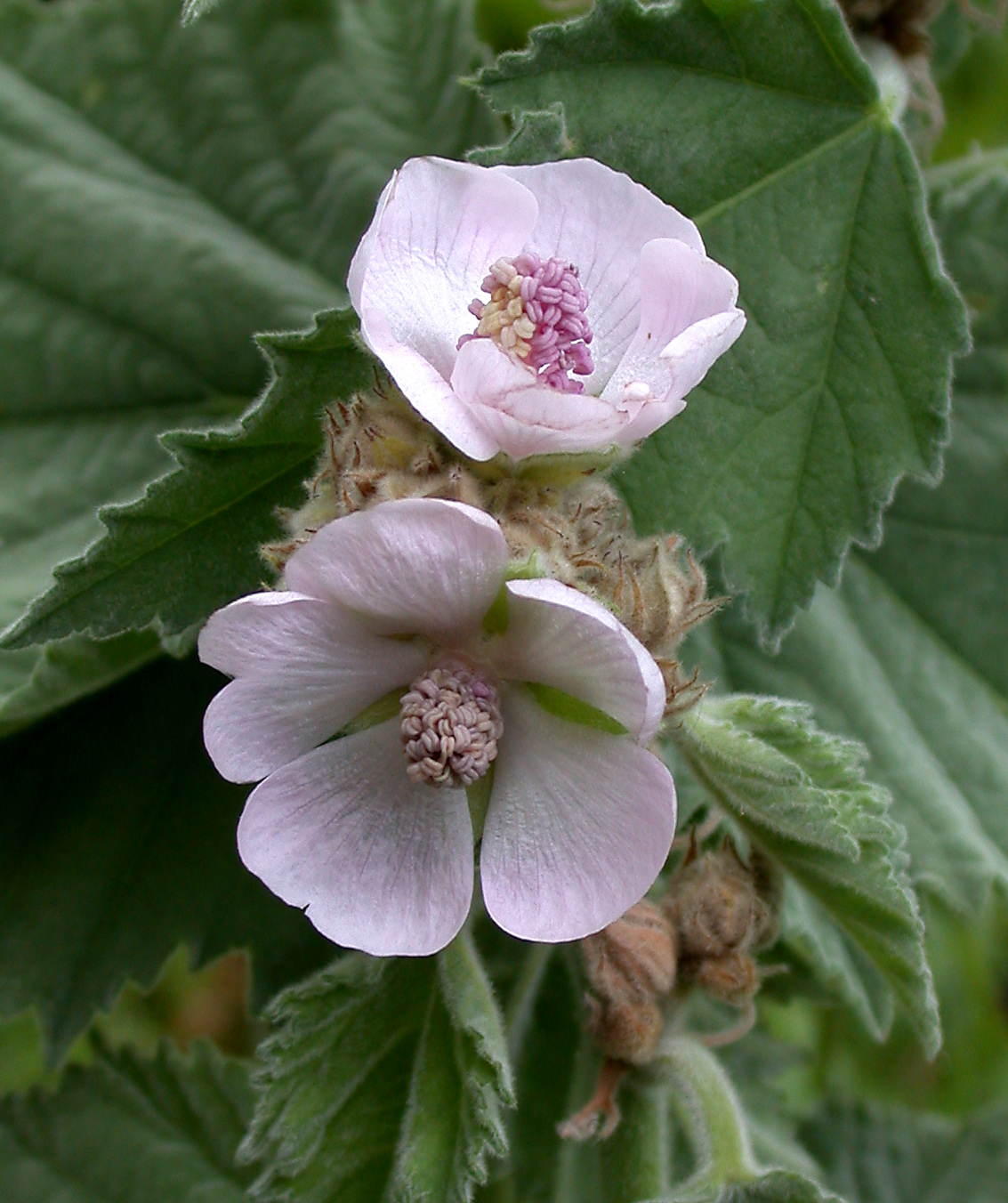
Flowers, showing purple anthers when unopened (England)

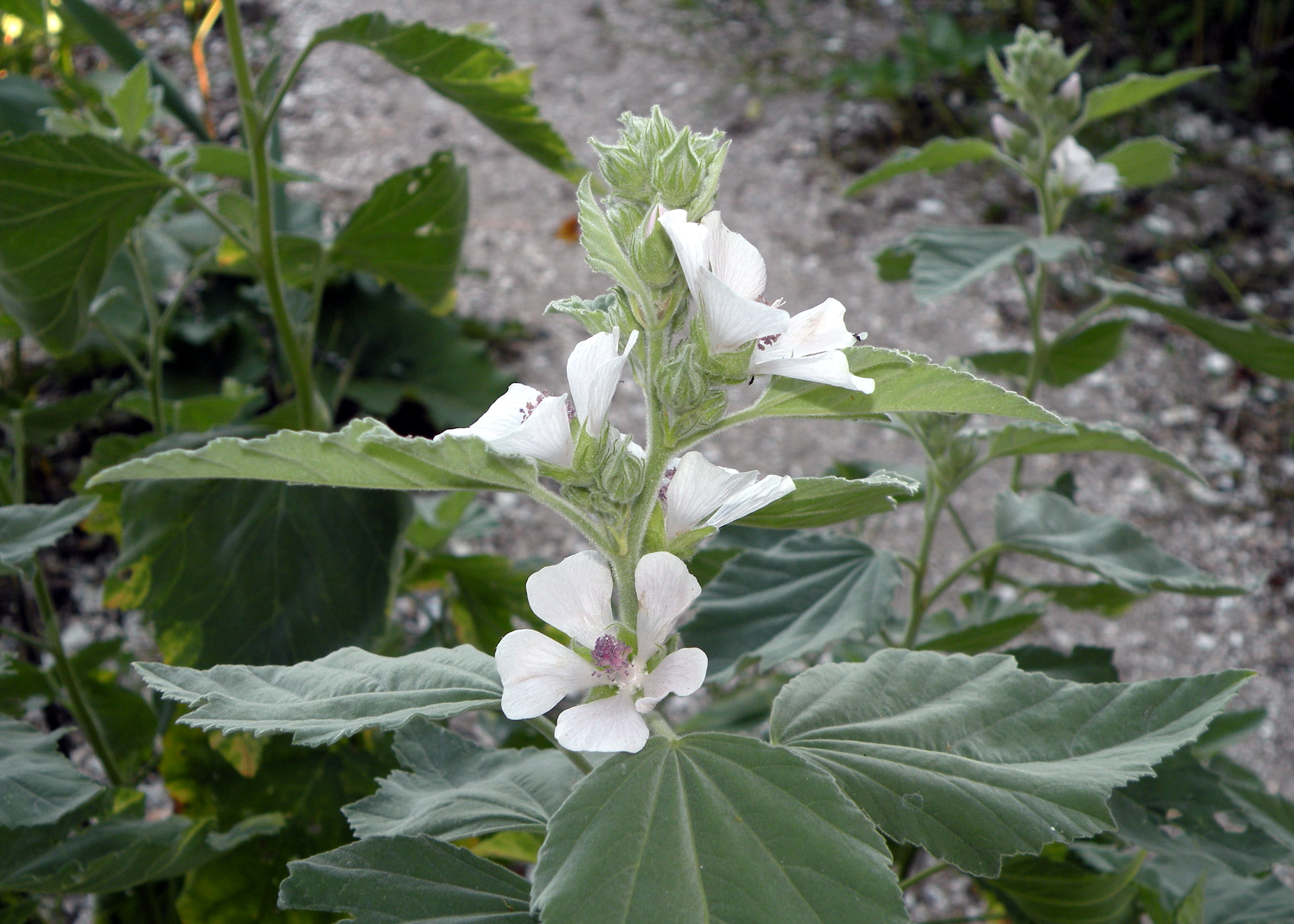
Unopened flower buds from side, showing epicalyces at bud (calyx) bases and velvety plant stem (England)

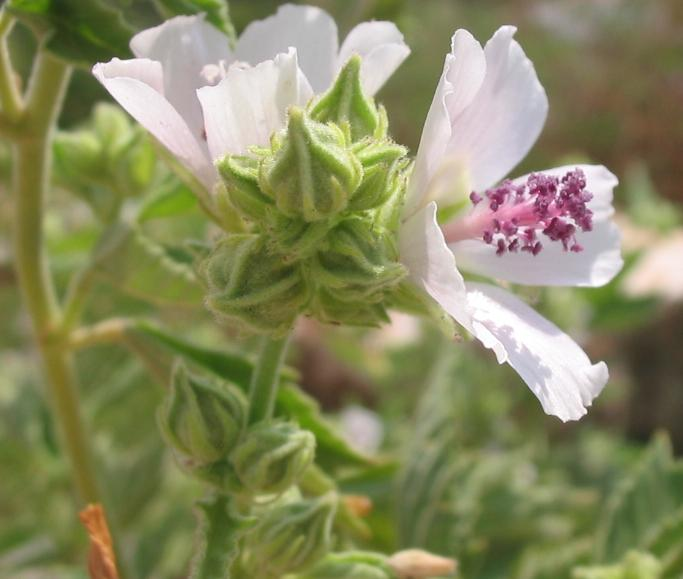
Unopened flower buds from above, showing tips of epicalyces that are at bud (calyx) base

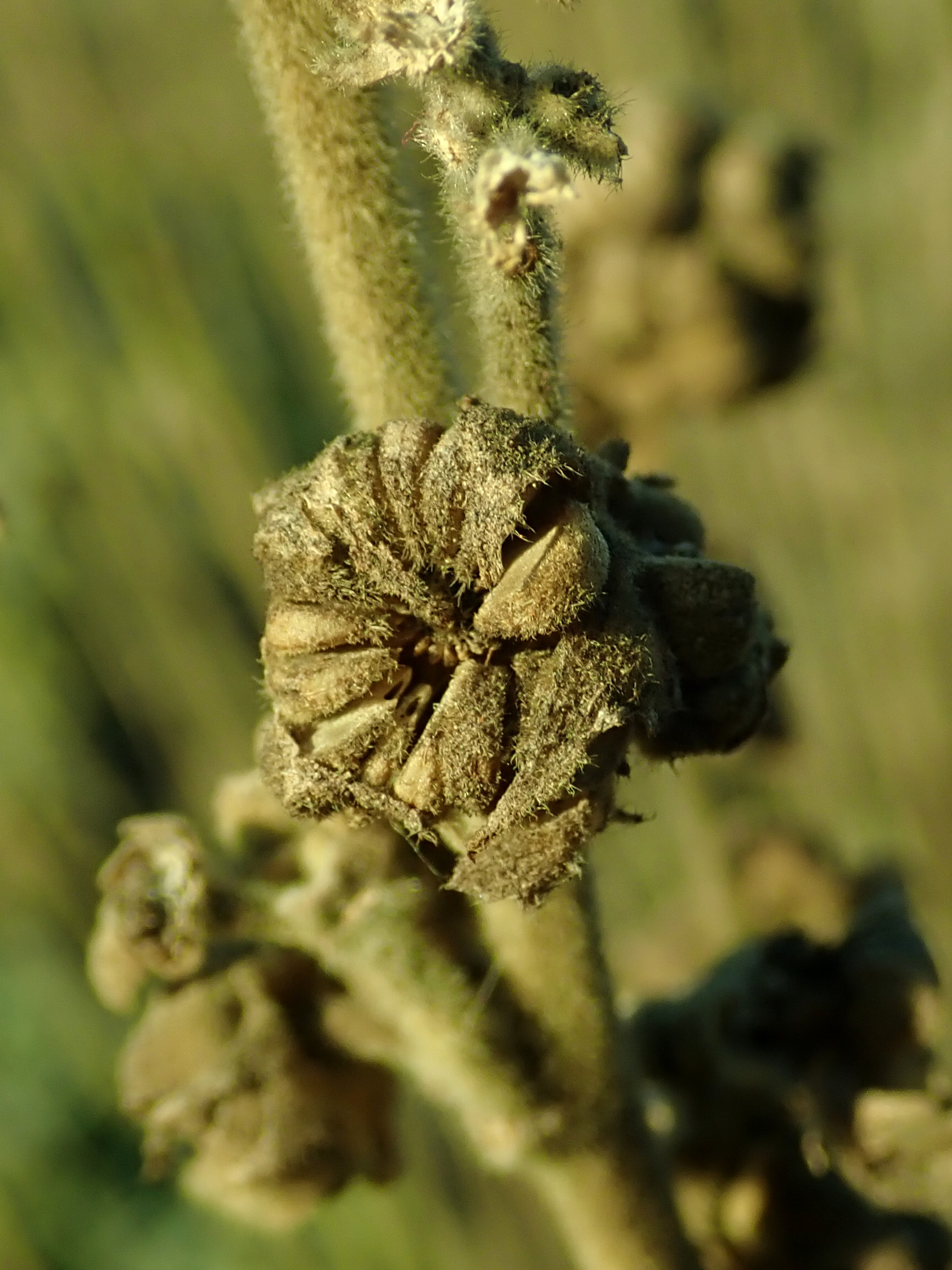
Fruits, showing hairs on smooth fruit surface

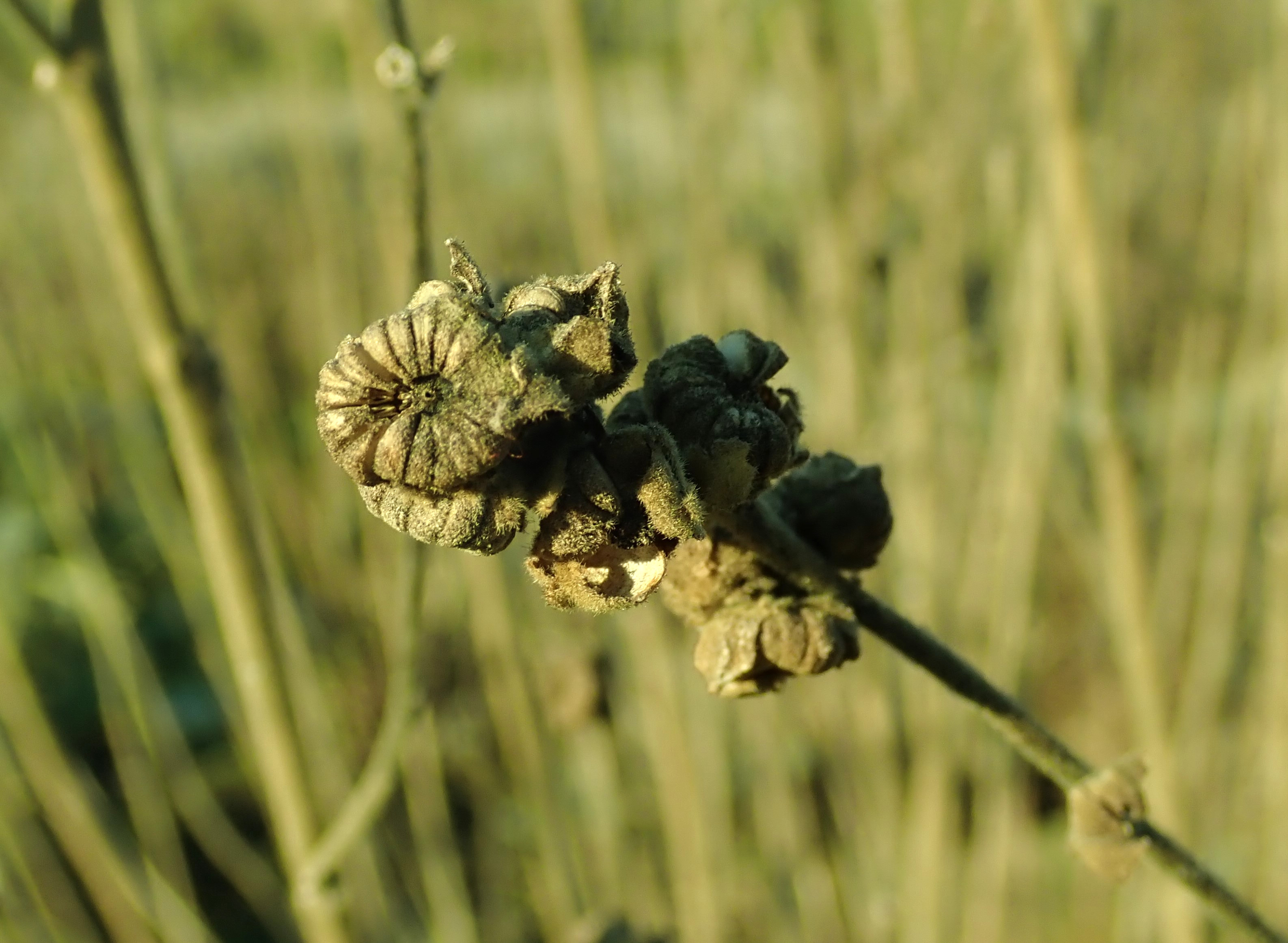
Fruits, showing a cluster

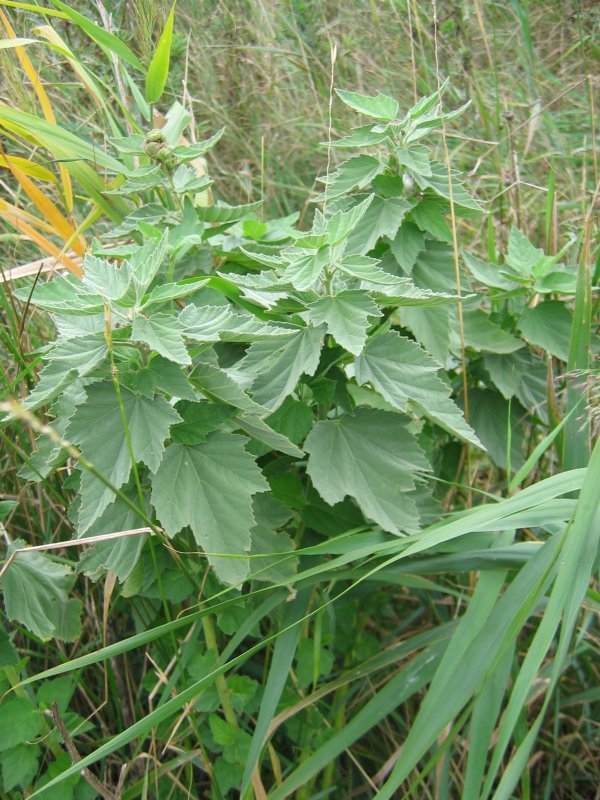
Velvety leaves (Germany)

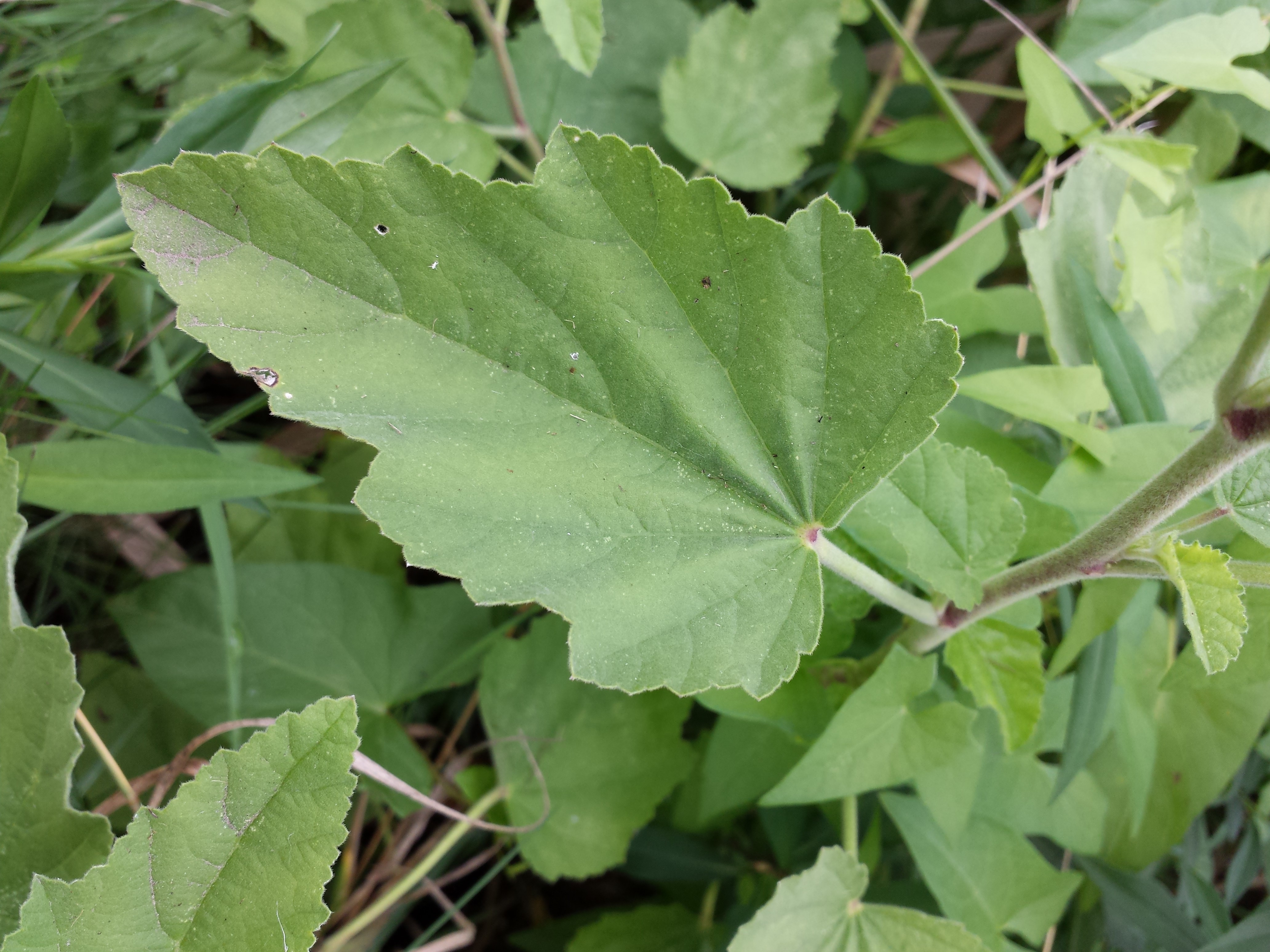
Leaf, velvety (here slightly)
