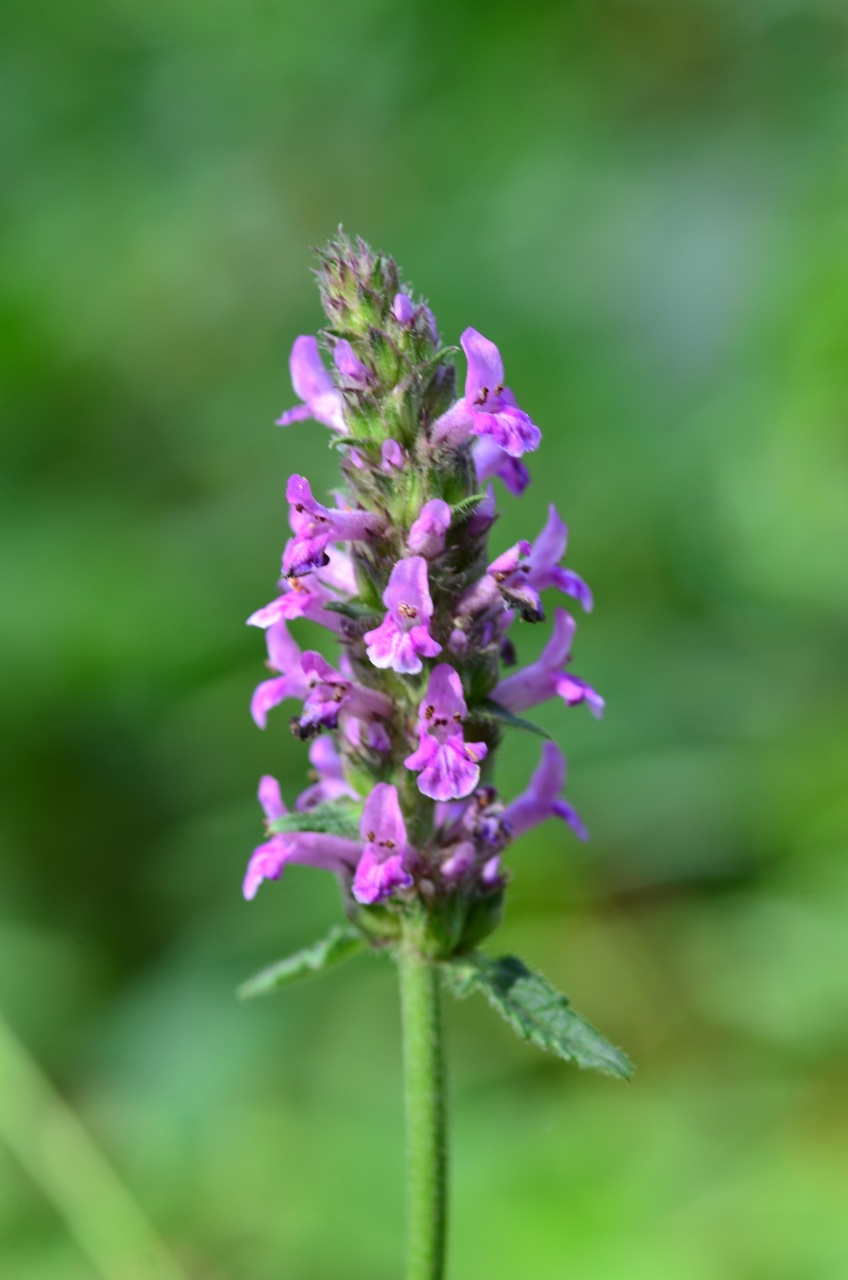

Scientific classification
- Kingdom: Plantae
- Clade: Embryophytes
- Clade: Tracheophytes
- Clade: Angiosperms
- Clade: Eudicots
- Clade: Asterids
- Order: Lamiales
- Family: Lamiaceae
- Genus: Betonica
- Species: B. officinalis

Binomial name
- Betonica officinalis L.

Synonyms
- Stachys betonica Benth.; Stachys officinalis (L.) Trevis.; Stachys monieri (Gouan) P.W.Ball

= Betonica officinalis =

Species of flowering plant

Betonica officinalis, common name betony is a species of flowering plant in the mint family Lamiaceae, native to Europe, western Asia, and northern Africa. Other vernacular names include wood betony, common hedgenettle, purple betony, bishopwort, or bishop's wort. Its 'Hummelo' cultivar has gained the Royal Horticultural Society's Award of Garden Merit.

It was until recently usually included in the genus Stachys as its synonym Stachys officinalis, but Betonica was separated at genus rank from Stachys when a detailed examination showed clear consistent differences in both the foliage and flowers, valid at a higher rank than the previous treatment as just a subgenus. This has been confirmed by genetic study, which shows Betonica is separate from Stachys and more closely related to the hemp-nettles Galeopsis.

The Latin specific epithet officinalis refers to plants which had a culinary or medicinal use.

== Description ==
Betonica officinalis is a rhizomatous, patch-forming, grassland herbaceous perennial growing to 30–60 cm (12–24 in) tall. Its leaves are stalked on upright stems, narrowly oval, with a heart-shaped base, with a somewhat wrinkled texture and toothed margins. The calyx is 5–7 mm long, with 5 teeth, edged with bristles. The corolla 1–1.5 cm long. Its upper lip flat, almost straight when seen from the side. The anthers stick straight out. It flowers in mid summer from July to September, and is found in dry grassland, meadows and open woods in most of Europe, western Asia and North Africa. In the British Isles it is common in England and Wales, but scarce in southern Scotland and rare in Ireland and northern Scotland.

The aerial parts contain phenylethanoid glycosides betonyosides A-F, acetoside, acetoside isomer, campneosides II, forsythoside B, and leucosceptoside B. The roots contain the diterpene glycosides betonicosides A-D and the diterpene betonicolide.

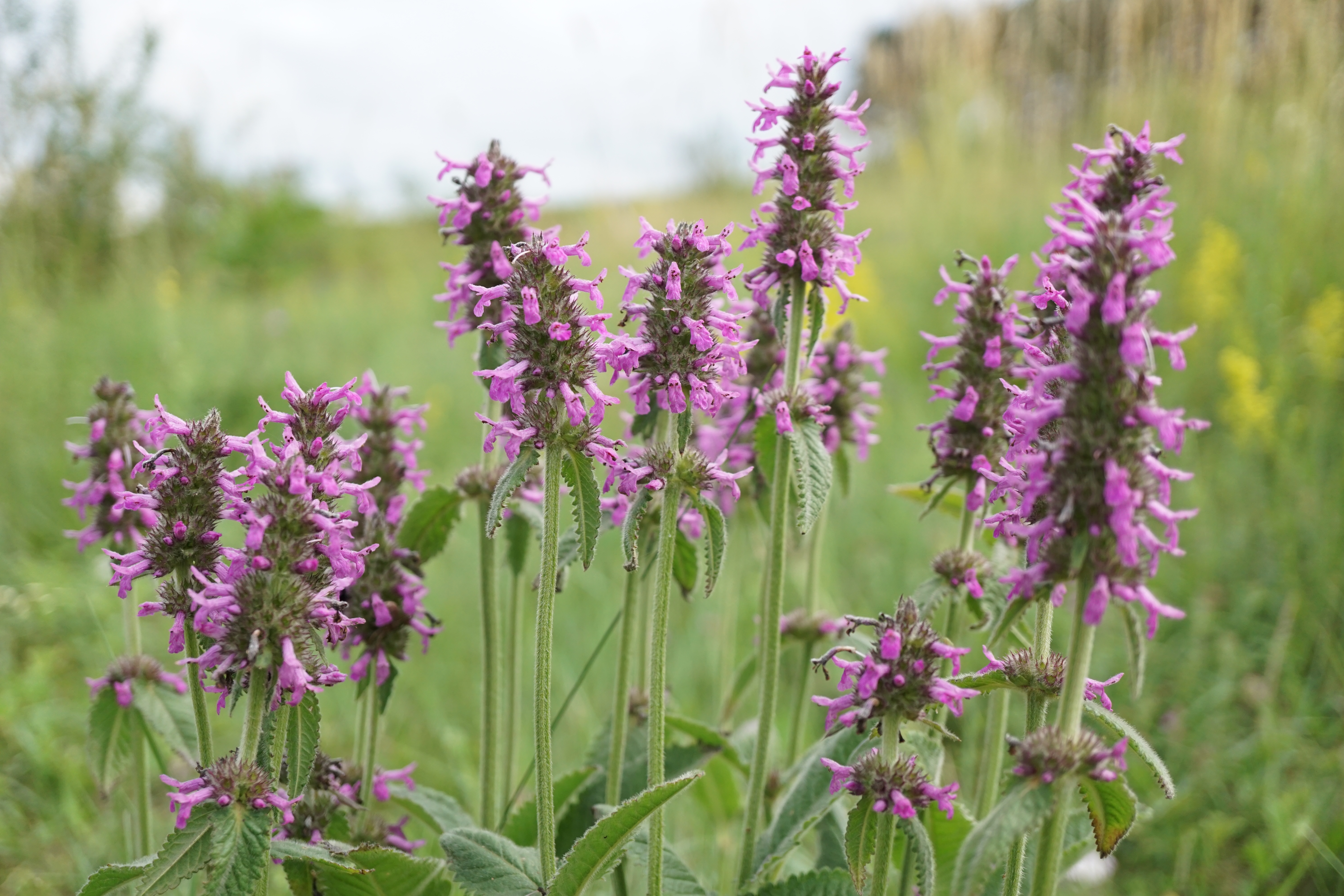
In flower

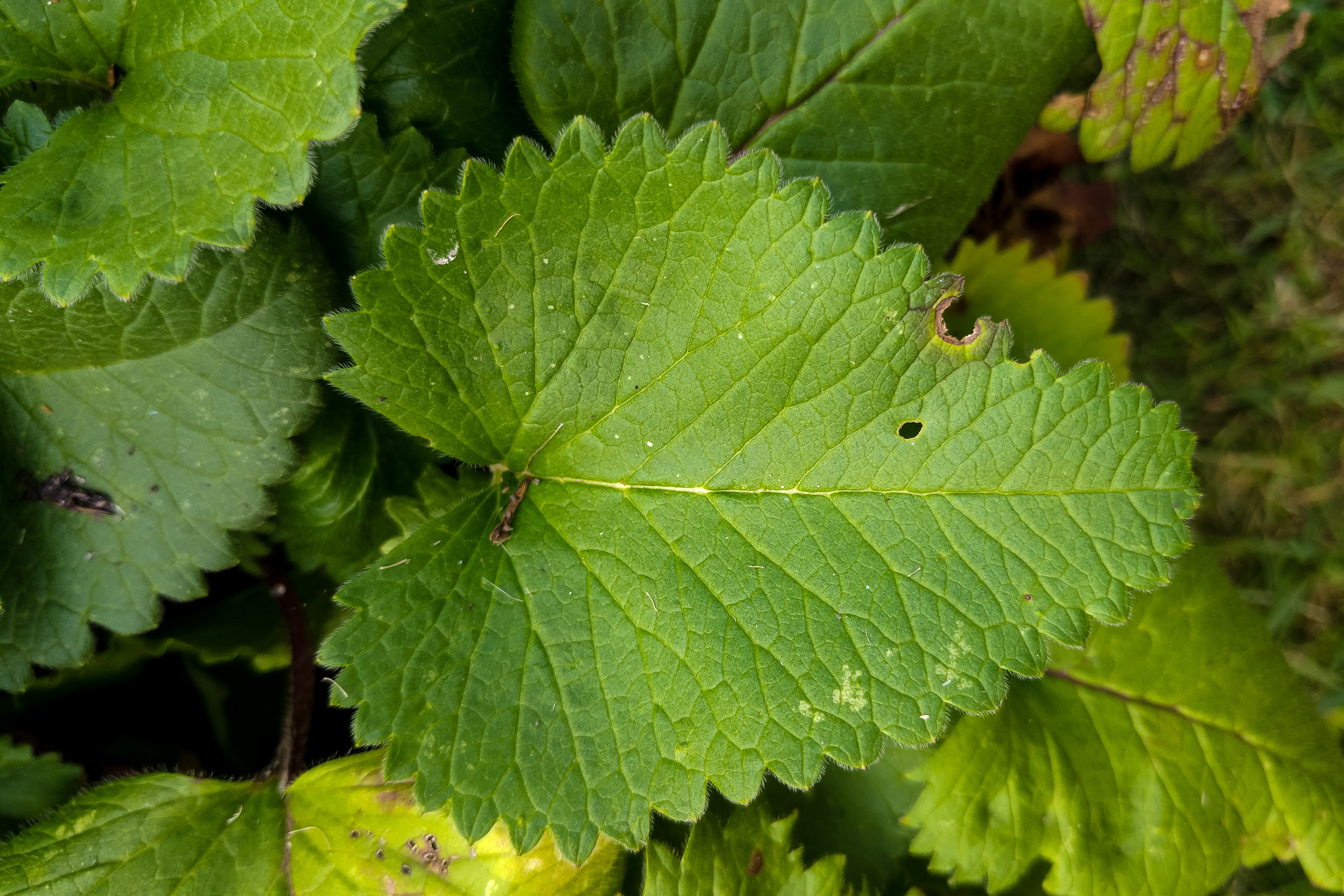
Basal leaf

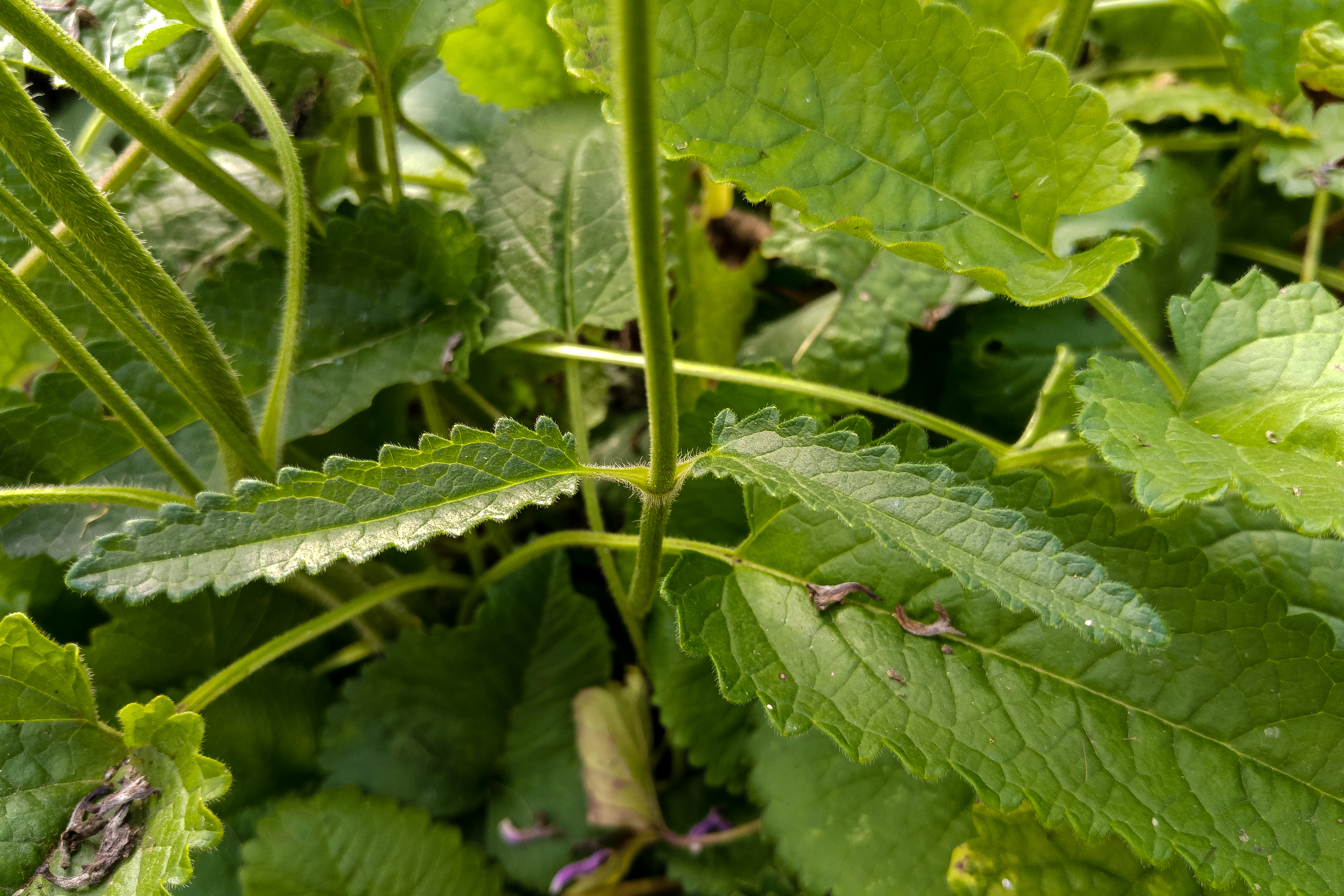
Stem leaves

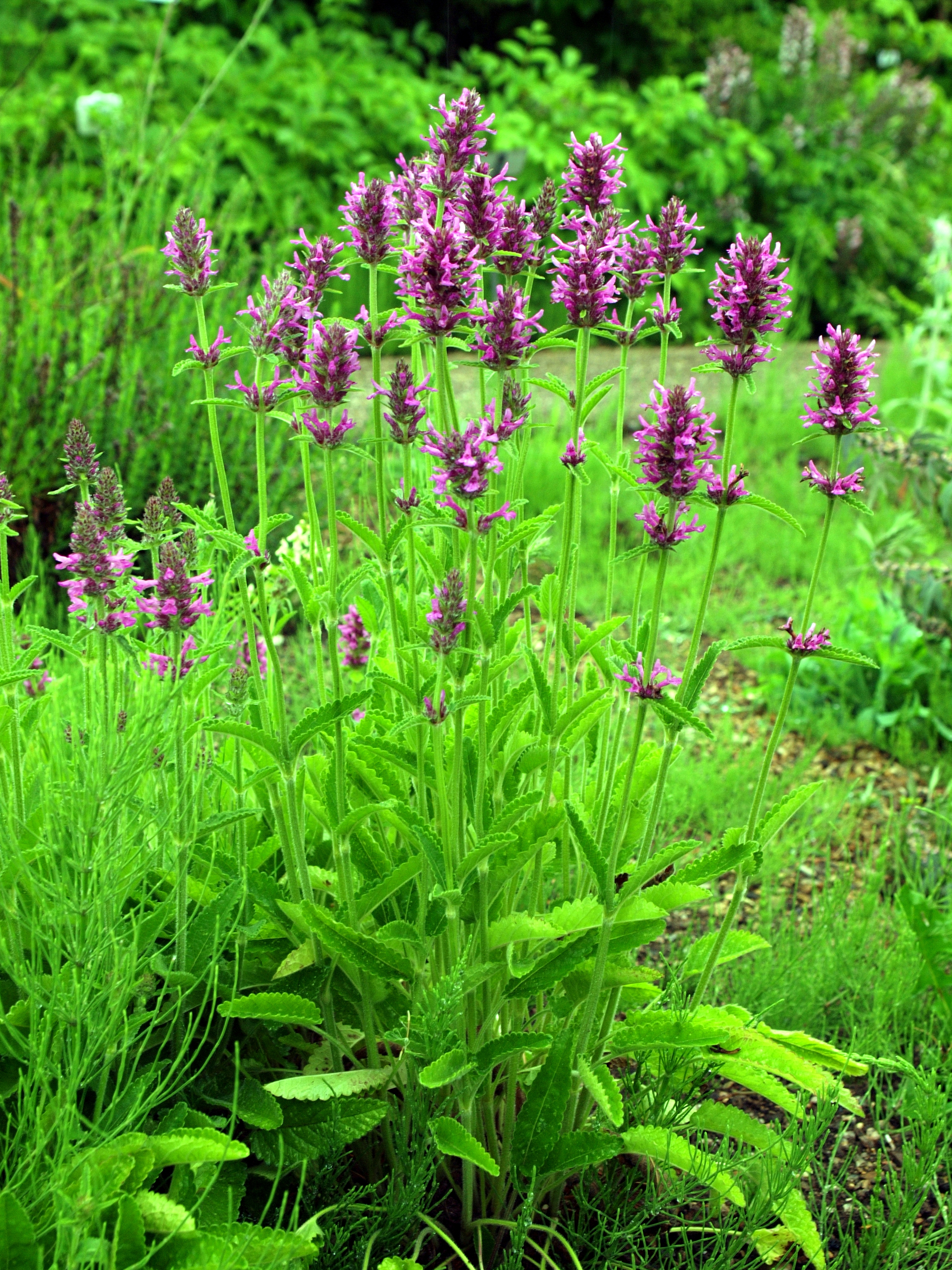
In cultivation

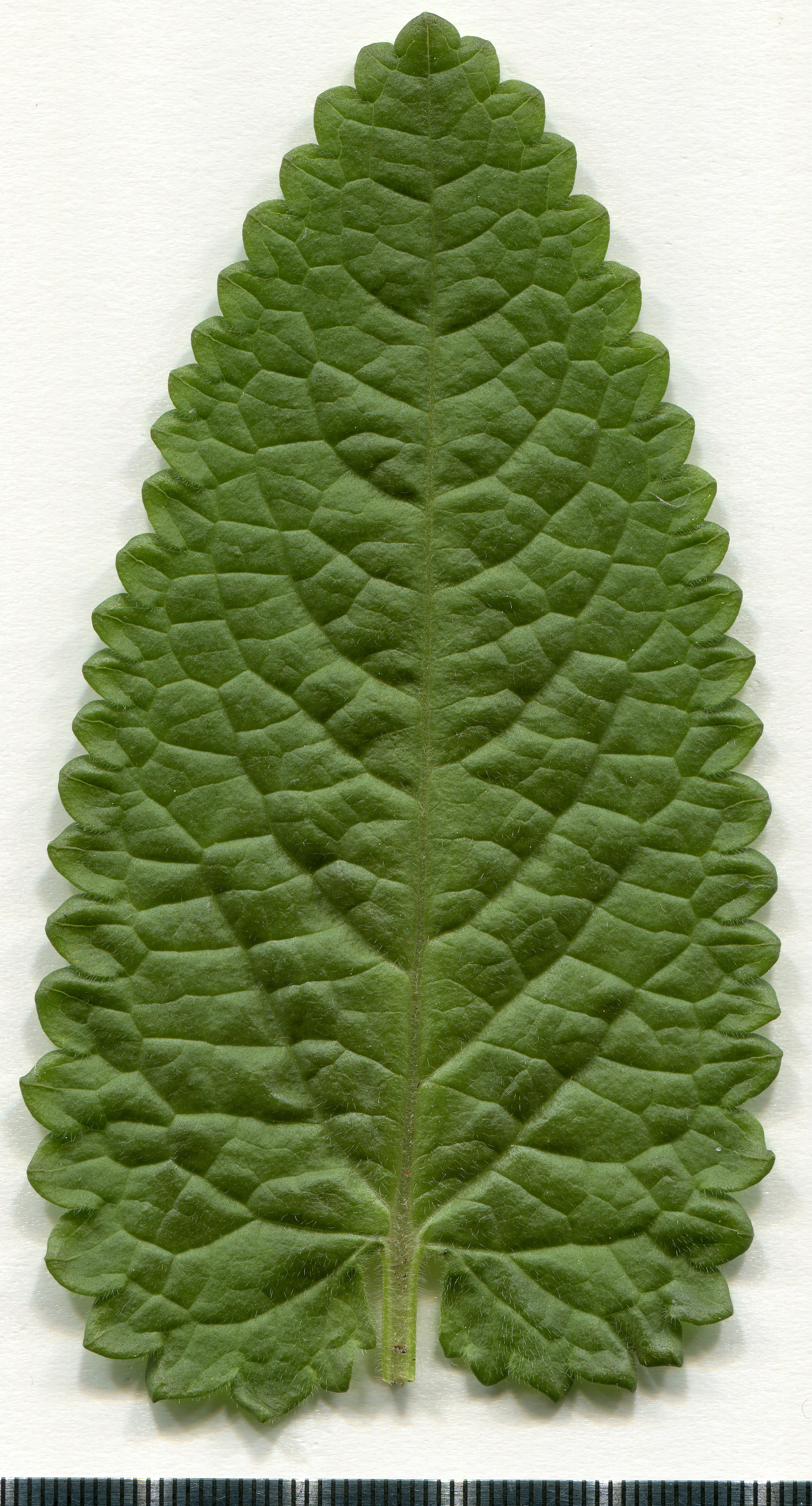
Leaf adaxial side.

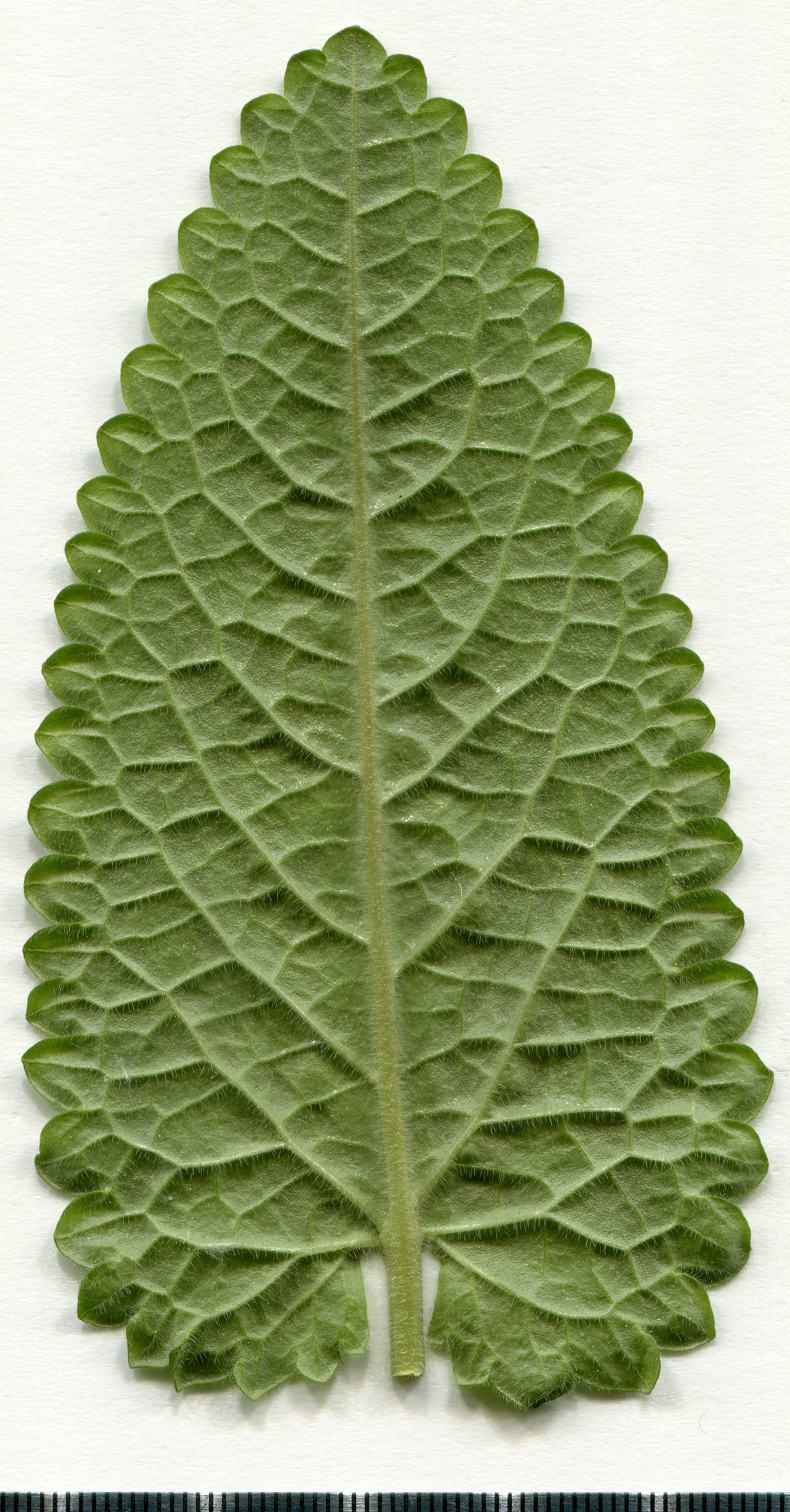
Leaf abaxial side.

== History and uses ==
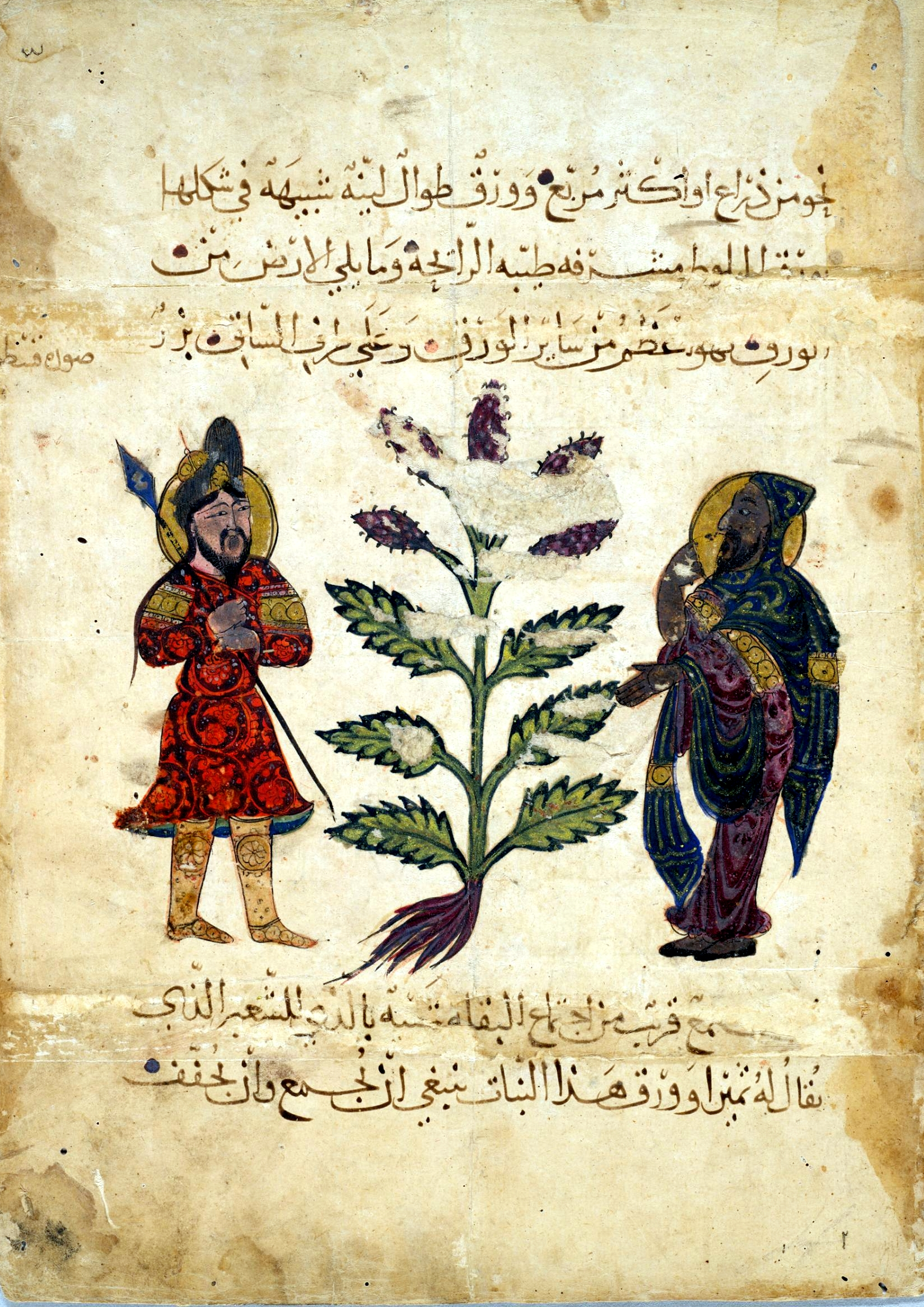
Betony in a 13th-century Arabic edition of De Materia Medica

In his Natural History, Pliny the Elder claims betony was "a plant more highly esteemed than any other", and documents a popular belief that merely possessing betony would protect a house from harm. Pliny also states it was discovered by the Vettones of Spain, hence the Gaulish name for the plant, Vettonica.

De herba Vettonica liber, a book originally attributed to Antonius Musa but now thought to have been written in the 4th century, lists nearly 50 uses for the plant. These include easing of pain and fever after childbirth, prevention of drunkenness, against snake and mad dog bites, curing of various pains, and against horrors. Pseudo-Musa also claims the herb was discovered by either the Greek god of medicine Aesculapius or the centaur Chiron.

Information about and uses for betony are compiled in Chapter 232 of John Gerard's 1597 Herball, or, Generall historie of plantes. Properties ascribed to it include help for those with "the falling sickness", cramps, ague, jaundice, and sciatica, clearing of the lungs, chest, liver, and gallbladder, killing of worms, and breakage of kidney stones, among many others.

In his 1652 work The English physitian, Nicholas Culpeper called it Wood-Betony to contrast it from Water-Betony, but noted it was also called Common Betony. He observed that "Bettony that grows in the shadow is far better than that which grows in the Sun, because it delights in the shadow". He mentions Antonius Musa as a source. His summary of uses for betony is vast, and reflects influence from Pseudo-Musa and the same tradition as Gerard: "Epidemical Diseases, Witchcraft, Apetite, Indigestion, Stomach, Belching, Jaundice, Falling-sickness, Palsey, Convulsion, Shrinking of the Sinews, Gout, Dropsie, Frensie, Cough, Cold, Shortness of Breath, Agues of all sorts, Sore Eyes, Worms, Obstructions of the Liver and Spleen, Stitches, Pains in the Back and Belly, Terms provokes, Mother, Childbirth Stone, Toothache, Venemous Beasts, Mad-dogs, Weariness, Bleeding at Mouth and Nose, Pissing & spitting of Blood, Ruptures, Bruises, Wounds, Veins and Sinews Cut, Ulcers, Fistulaes, Boyls, Ears." Culpeper classifies betony under the planet Jupiter and the sign Aries.

A Welsh prescription attributed to the Physicians of Myddfai ascribes dream-controlling properties to betony, advising hanging its leaves around the neck or drinking the juice before sleep.

The plant was commonly grown by monks and apothecaries for medicinal purposes, hence the specific epithet officinalis which indicates use for medicinal or culinary purposes.

Betony was an ingredient of Pistoia powder, an old remedy for arthritis and gout.

Betony is among the herbs possibly used by the Druids to make wine and holy water.

12 Prairial in the French Republican calendar is dedicated to betony.

Betony is mentioned in Cadfael season 1, episode 1, One Corpse Too Many, as Cadfael soaks a bandage with betony to help make the wound of a wounded person knit.

Betony has also been used in traditional Austrian medicine internally as tea, or externally as compresses or baths for treatment of disorders of the respiratory tract, gastrointestinal tract, nervous system, skin and gynecological problems.

Modern herbalists prescribe betony to treat anxiety, gallstones, heartburn, high blood pressure, migraine and neuralgia, and to prevent sweating. It can also be used as an ointment for cuts and sores.
