= Hortensis =

Hortensis may refer to:

- Anemone hortensis, a plant that has mauve flowers
- Arion hortensis, also known by its common name the "garden slug"
- Atriplex hortensis, a hardy, annual plant
- Majorana hortensis, a somewhat cold-sensitive perennial herb
- Sylvia hortensis, western Orphean warbler
- Eisenia hortensis or European nightcrawler, a medium-small earthworm
- Cepaea hortensis or the White-lipped snail, a common land snail
