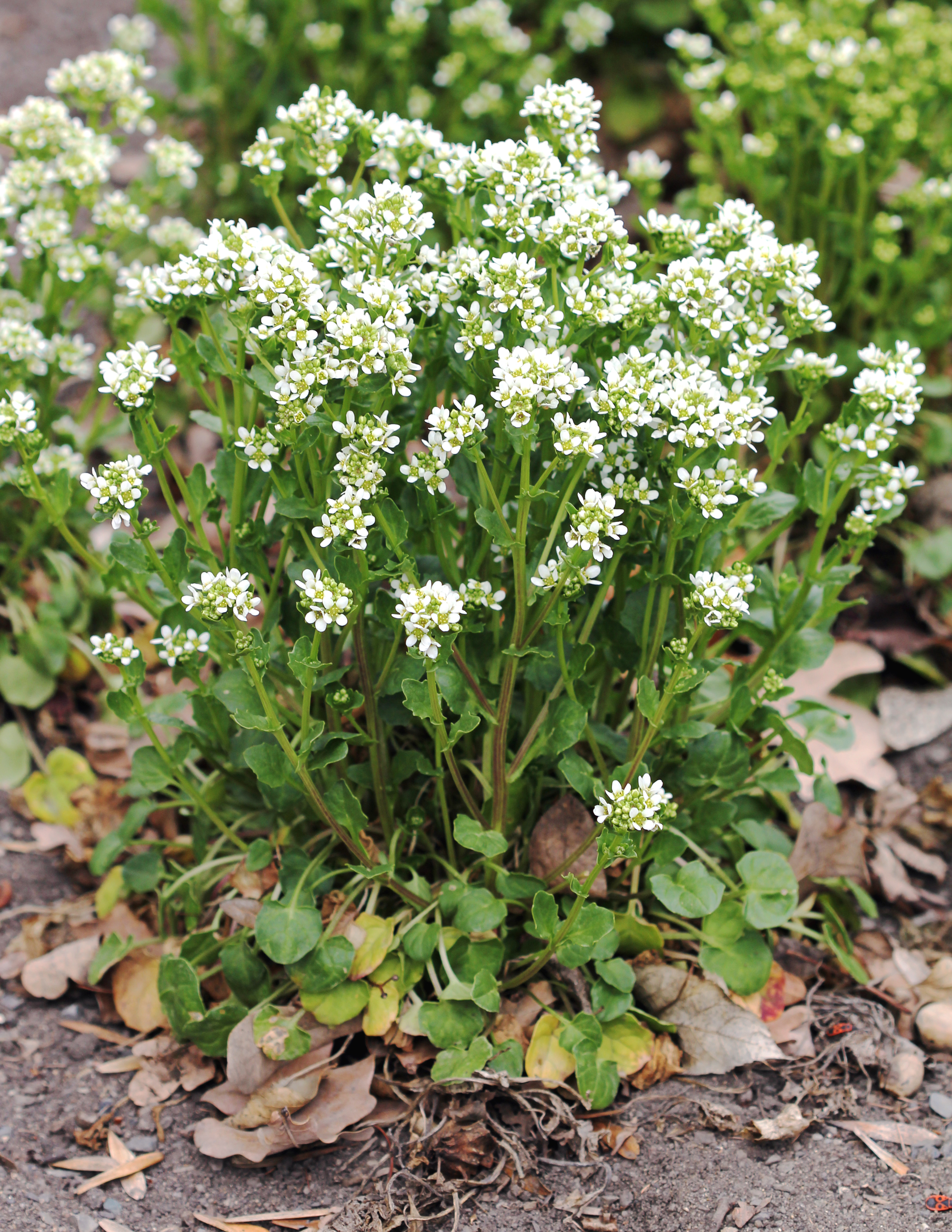

Scientific classification
- Kingdom: Plantae
- Clade: Tracheophytes
- Clade: Angiosperms
- Clade: Eudicots
- Clade: Rosids
- Order: Brassicales
- Family: Brassicaceae
- Genus: Cochlearia
- Species: C. officinalis

Binomial name
- Cochlearia officinalis L.

= Cochlearia officinalis =

Species of flowering plant

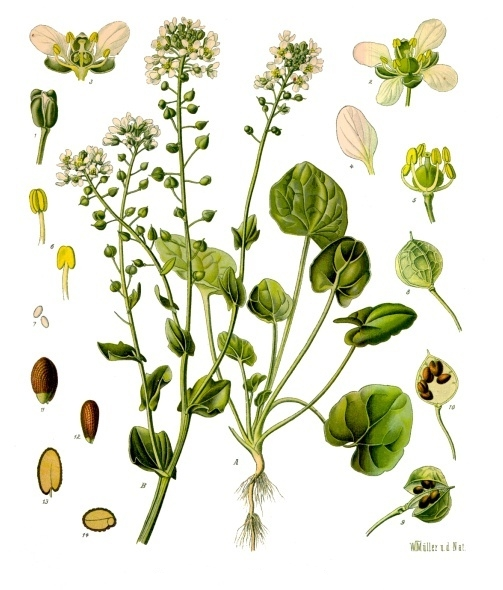
Illustration

Cochlearia officinalis, common scurvygrass, scurvy-grass, or spoonwort, is a species of flowering plant in the family Brassicaceae. The plant acquired its common name from the observation that it cured scurvy.

== Description ==
Cochlearia officinalis is a biennial/perennial, growing to 10–50 cm (4–19 1/2 in). The stems are hairless and long stalked with fleshy leaves. The leaves are heart or kidney shaped, the lower stems leaves form a rosette around the base of the plant. Blooming from May to August, the flowers are small, white or lilac, with four daisy-like petals. The spherical seeds ripen from July to September. The small, round seeds are reddish-brown. The flowers are hermaphrodite and the plant is self-fertile.

Flowers

== Taxonomy ==
It is commonly known as 'common scurvy-grass', 'scurvy-grass' and 'spoonwort'.

It was formally described by the Swedish botanist Carl Linnaeus in his Species Plantarum in 1753.

The specific epithet officinalis refers to the Linnaean term for plants with an established medicinal, culinary, or other use.

It has one known subspecies, Cochlearia officinalis subsp. integrifolia (Hartm.) Nordal & Stabbetorp.

== Distribution and habitat ==
Cochlearia officinalis is native to temperate Europe.

=== Range ===
It is found within Eastern Europe, in the Russian Federation, (within the Administrative centre of Arkhangelsk, Komi, Murmansk and Nenets). In Central Europe, within Belgium, Germany, Netherlands and Switzerland. In Northern Europe, within Iceland, Denmark, the Faroe Islands, Finland, Ireland, Norway, Sweden and the United Kingdom, and in Southwestern Europe within France.

It has also naturalised in other parts of Europe such as Italy and Spain.

=== Habitat ===
It grows in the coastal and mountainous regions of Europe, including the Alps. In Ireland, it prefers saltmarshes, coastal cliffs and walls, and rocky, muddy seashores. In Northern Scandinavia, it grows in gravel beaches, crevices in beach cliffs and salt marshes.

== Ecology ==
The flowers are pollinated by bees, flies, and beetles. The plant attracts wildlife and tolerates frost.

== Uses ==
It was once used by herbalists as a cure for scurvy, as the plant contains Vitamin C. Nicholas Culpeper wrote of scurvygrass in his book Complete Herbal that its chief good effect is when used "by those that have the scurvy" and that it "is of singular good effect to cleanse the blood, liver and spleen, taking the juice in the Spring every morning fasting in a cup of drink". The plant was taken onboard ships in dried bundles or distilled extracts. Its very bitter taste was usually disguised with herbs and spices. Scurvygrass drinks and sandwiches were a popular in the UK until the mid-19th century, when citrus fruits became more readily available.

The leaves were made into a beer called scurvygrass ale, which has been occasionally remade as a craft ale.

== Gallery ==
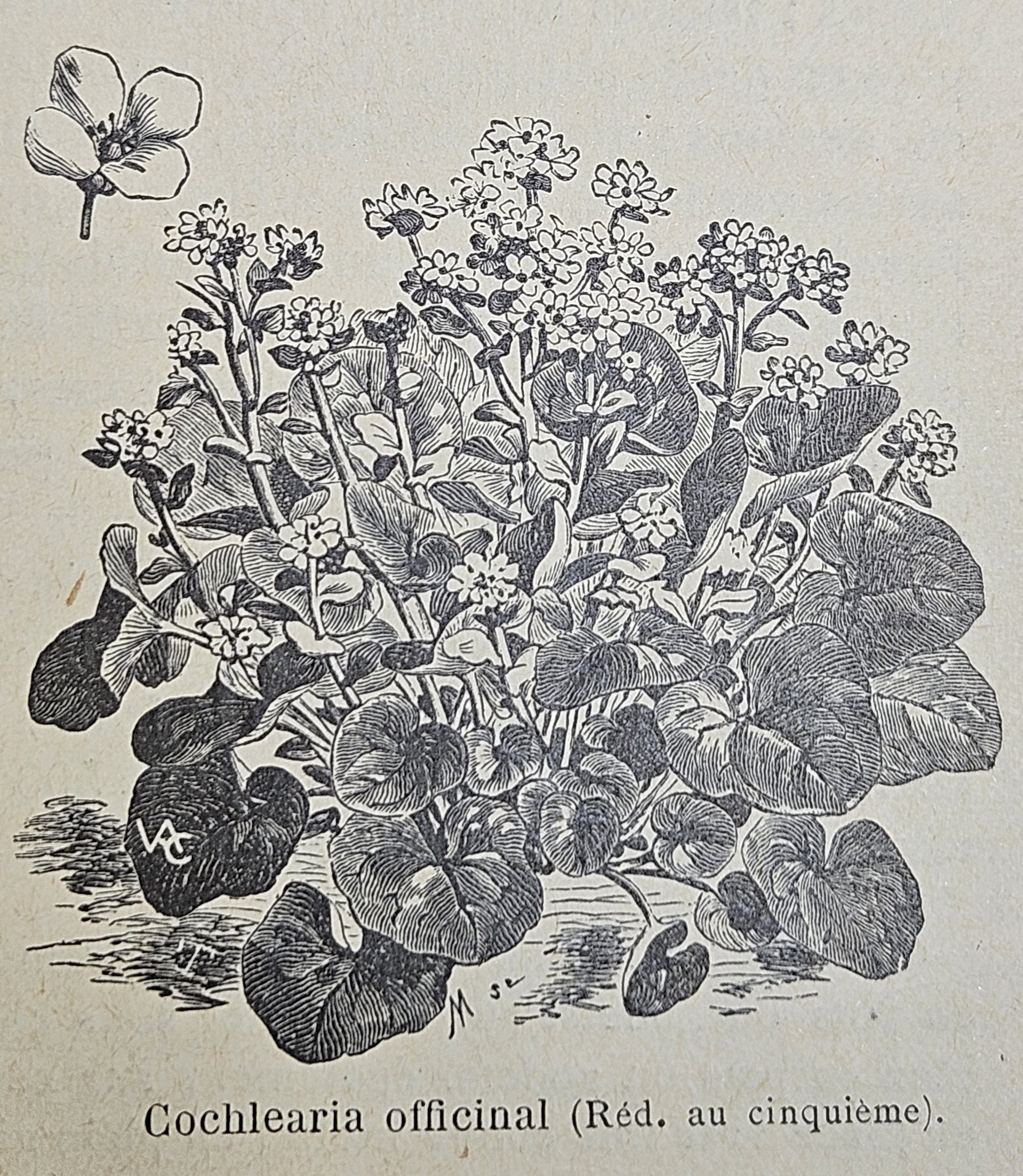
Illustration of Cochlearia officinalis in "Les Plantes potagères" Vilmorin 1925
