= Officinalis =

Term in biology

Officinalis, officinale, or occasionally officinarum is a Medieval Latin epithet denoting organisms—mainly plants—with uses in medicine, herbalism, manufacturing, and cookery. It commonly occurs as a specific epithet, the second term of a two-part botanical name. Officinalis is used to modify masculine and feminine nouns, while officinale is used for neuter nouns.

== Etymology ==
The word officinalis literally means 'of or belonging to an officīna', the storeroom of a monastery, where medicines and other necessaries were kept. Officīna was a contraction of opificīna, from opifex (gen. opificis) 'worker, maker, doer' (from opus 'work') + -fex, -ficis, 'one who does', from facere 'do, perform'. When Linnaeus invented the binomial system of nomenclature, he gave the specific name officinalis, in the 1735 (1st Edition) of his Systema Naturae, to plants (and sometimes animals or fungi) with an established medicinal, culinary, or other use.

== Species ==
- Alpina officinarum (Galangal)
- Althaea officinalis (Marshmallow)
- Anchusa officinalis (Bugloss)
- Asparagus officinalis (Asparagus)
- Avicennia officinalis (Mangrove)
- Betonica officinalis (Betony) syn. Stachys officinalis
- Bistorta officinalis (European Bistort)
- Borago officinalis (Borage)
- Buddleja officinalis (Pale Butterflybush)
- Calendula officinalis (Pot Marigold)
- Cinchona officinalis (Quinine)
- Cochlearia officinalis (Scurvygrass)
- Corallina officinalis (Coral Weed (seaweed))
- Cornus officinalis (Cornelian Cherry)
- Cyathula officinalis (Oxe knee)
- Cynoglossum officinale (Houndstongue)
- Euphrasia officinalis (Eyebright)
- Fumaria officinalis (Fumitory)
- Galega officinalis (Goat's Rue)
- Gratiola officinalis (Hedge Hyssop)
- Guaiacum officinale (lignum vitae)
- Hyssopus officinalis (Hyssop)
- Jasminum officinale (Jasmine)
- Laricifomes officinalis (Quinine Conk)
- Lavandula officinalis (English Lavender) syn. Lavandula angustifolia
- Levisticum officinale (Lovage)
- Lithospermum officinale (Gromwell)
- Magnolia officinalis
- Melilotus officinalis (Ribbed Melilot)
- Melissa officinalis (Lemon Balm)
- Morinda officinalis (Indian Mulberry)
- Nasturtium officinale (Watercress)
- Paeonia officinalis (Common Paeony)
- Parietaria officinalis (Pellitory of the Wall)
- Pilosella officinarum (Mouse-Ear)
- Pimenta officinalis (Allspice) syn. Pimenta dioica
- Pulmonaria officinalis (Lungwort)
- Rheum officinale (Rhubarb)
- Rosa gallica 'Officinalis' (Apothecary Rose)
- Rosmarinus officinalis (Rosemary) syn. Salvia rosmarinus
- Salvia officinalis (Garden Sage)
- Sanguisorba officinalis (Great Burnet)
- Saponaria officinalis (Soapwort)
- Scindapsus officinalis (Long Pepper)
- Senega officinalis (Senega) syn. Polygala senega
- Sepia officinalis (Cuttlefish)
- Sisymbrium officinale (Hedge Mustard)
- Spongia officinalis (Bath Sponge)
- Styrax officinalis (Drug Snowbell)
- Symphytum officinale (Comfrey)
- Taraxacum officinale (Dandelion)
- Valeriana officinalis (Valerian)
- Verbena officinalis (Vervain)
- Veronica officinalis (Speedwell)
- Zingiber officinale (Ginger)

== See also ==
- Esculentus, a species name translating to 'edible'.
- Hortensis, a species name roughly translating to 'of the garden'.
- Oleraceus, an epithet denoting a species that has an extensive history of use as a vegetable and/or culinary plant.
- Sativum, Sativus, or Sativa, a species name translating to 'cultivated'.
- Tinctorius or Tinctoria, denotes a species that has a history of use for dyeing.
