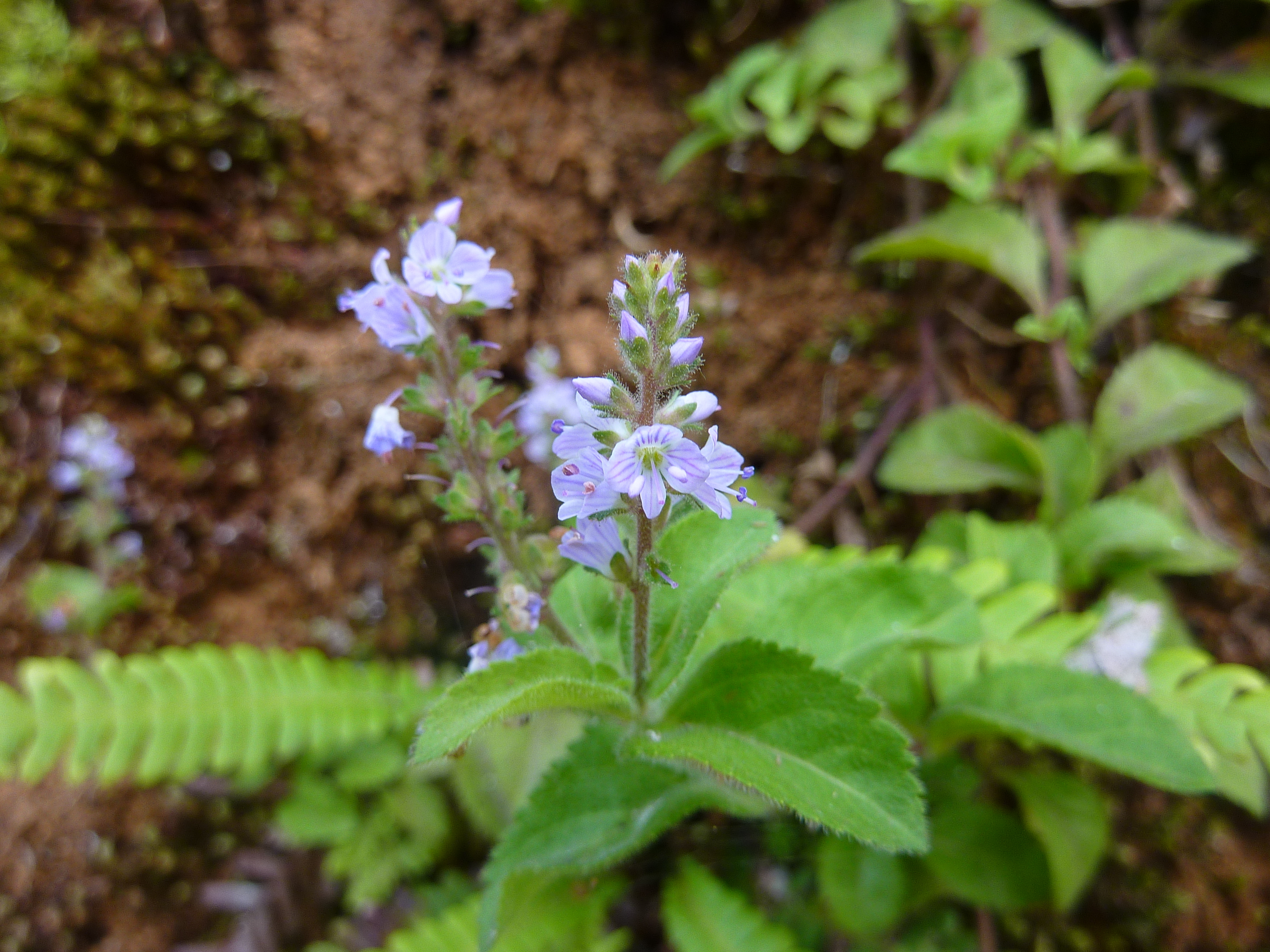

Scientific classification
- Kingdom: Plantae
- Clade: Tracheophytes
- Clade: Angiosperms
- Clade: Eudicots
- Clade: Asterids
- Order: Lamiales
- Family: Plantaginaceae
- Genus: Veronica
- Species: V. officinalis

Binomial name
- Veronica officinalis L.

= Veronica officinalis =

Species of flowering plant in the plantain family

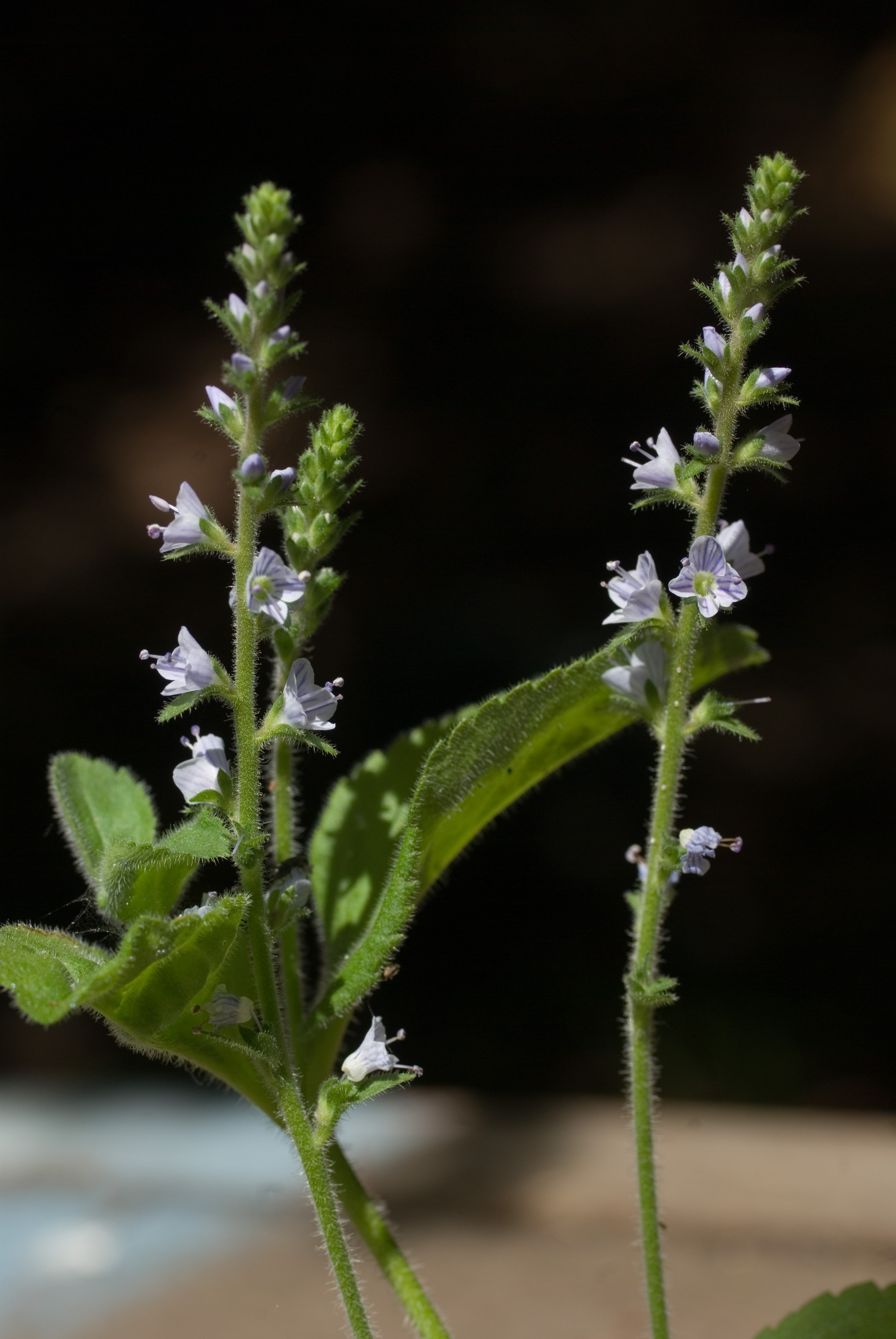
Heath speedwell in Oregon

Veronica officinalis, the heath speedwell, common gypsyweed, common speedwell, or Paul's betony, is a species of flowering plant in the plantain family Plantaginaceae. It is native to Europe and western Asia. It has been introduced to North America and is widely naturalised there.

== Description ==
It is a herbaceous perennial with hairy green stems 10–50 cm (4–20 in) long that cover the ground in mats and send up short vertical shoots which bear soft violet flowers. The leaves are 1.5–5 cm (0.6–2.0 in) and 1–3 cm (0.4–1.2 in) broad, and softly hairy.

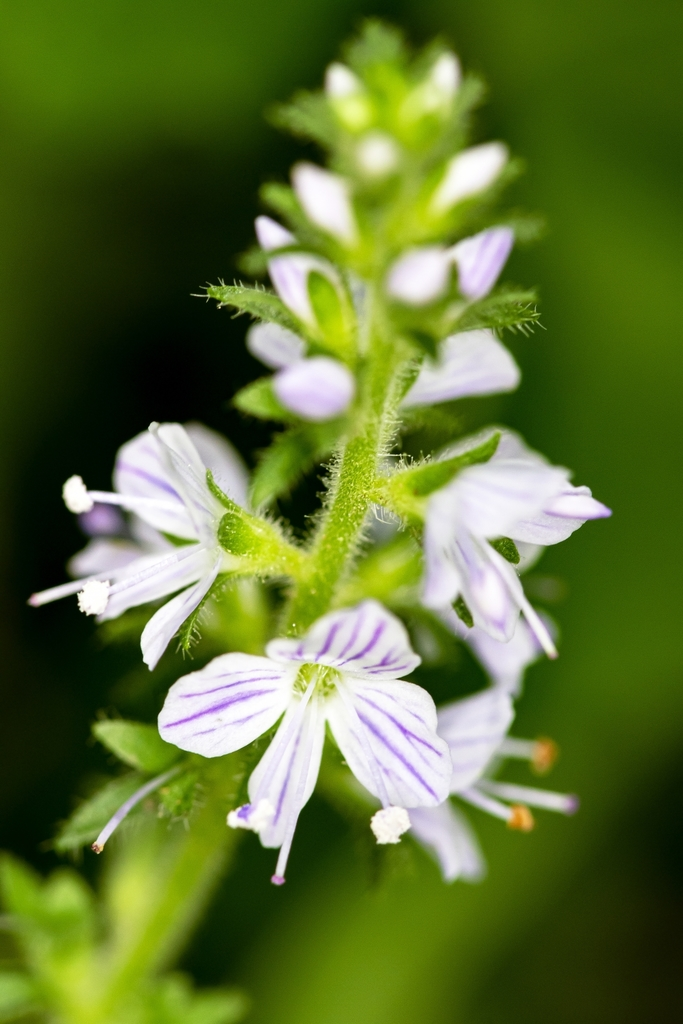
Heath speedwell in Pennsylvania

It flowers from May until August.

== Cultivation and uses ==
This speedwell grows in open areas, such as fields, meadows and gardens, where it is sometimes grown as an edible, or medicinal herb.

The slightly bitter and astringent taste and tea-like smell of speedwell led to its use as a tea substitute in 19th-century France, where it was called thé d'Europe, or "Europe tea". The French still use this term as a name for speedwell.
