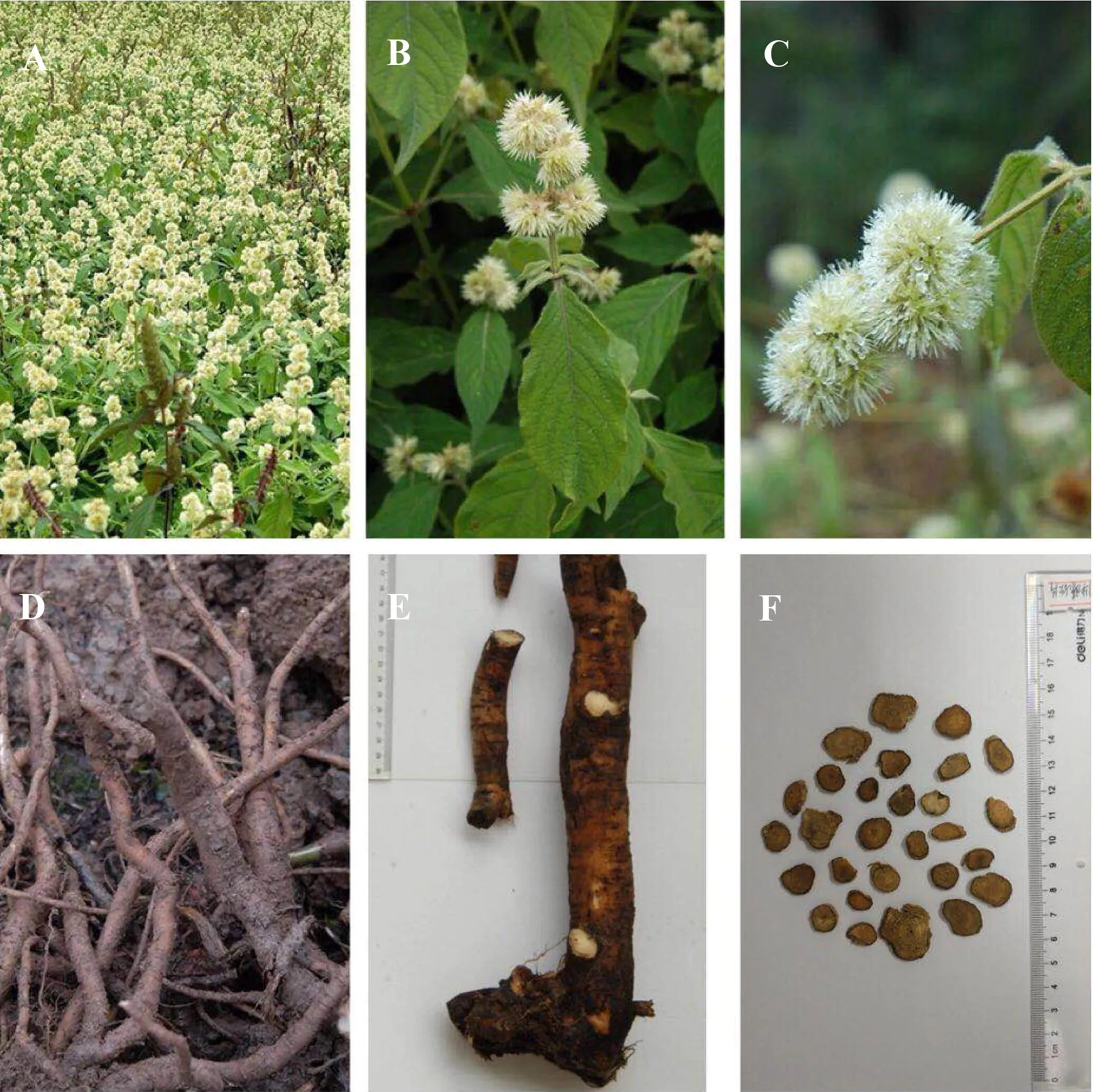
- Cyathulae Radix (A). Flower of Cyathulae Radix (B, C). Roots of Cyathulae Radix (D, E). Transverse section of Cyathulae Radix (F)

Scientific classification
- Kingdom: Plantae
- Clade: Tracheophytes
- Clade: Angiosperms
- Clade: Eudicots
- Order: Caryophyllales
- Family: Amaranthaceae
- Genus: Cyathula
- Species: C. officinalis

Binomial name
- Cyathula officinalis K.C.Kuan

= Cyathula officinalis =

Species of flowering plant

Cyathula officinalis (English common names: Cyathula root, Radix Cyathula, ox knee, Chinese: chuan niu xi), is a species of Cyathula native to the China (Guizhou, Hebei, Shanxi, Sichuan, Yunnan, Zhejiang) and Nepal. Its IPNI number is 60176-1.
