= Sativum =

Latin term

Sativa, sativus, and sativum are Latin botanical adjectives meaning cultivated. It is often associated botanically with plants that promote good health and used to designate certain seed-grown domestic crops.

== Usage ==
Sativa (ending in -a) is the feminine form of the adjective, but masculine (-us) and neuter (-um) endings are also used to agree with the gender of the nouns they modify; for example, the masculine Crocus sativus and neuter Pisum sativum.

== List of plant names containing sativum ==
Examples of crops incorporating this word and its variations into their Latin name include:

- Allium sativum, garlic.
- Avena sativa, the common oat.
- Cannabis sativa, one of three forms of cannabis.
- Castanea sativa, sweet chestnut.
- Coriandrum sativum, coriander, also known as cilantro, an annual herb.
- Crocus sativus, the saffron crocus.
- Cucumis sativus, the cucumber.
- Daucus carota subsp. sativus, the carrot.
- Eruca sativa, the rocket or arugula, a leaf vegetable.
- Hordeum sativum, barley.
- Lactuca sativa, lettuce.
- Lathyrus sativus, grass pea
- Lepidium sativum, garden cress.
- Madia sativa, Chilean tarweed.
- Medicago sativa, alfalfa.
- Nigella sativa, a flower whose edible seeds are sometimes known as "black cumin" or "black caraway".
- Oryza sativa, rice.
- Pastinaca sativa., parsnip, a root vegetable closely related to the carrot and parsley; all belong to the family Apiaceae.
- Pisum sativum, pea plant.
- Ribes sativum, the whitecurrant.
- Vicia sativa, common vetch.

== See also ==
- List of Latin and Greek words commonly used in systematic names
