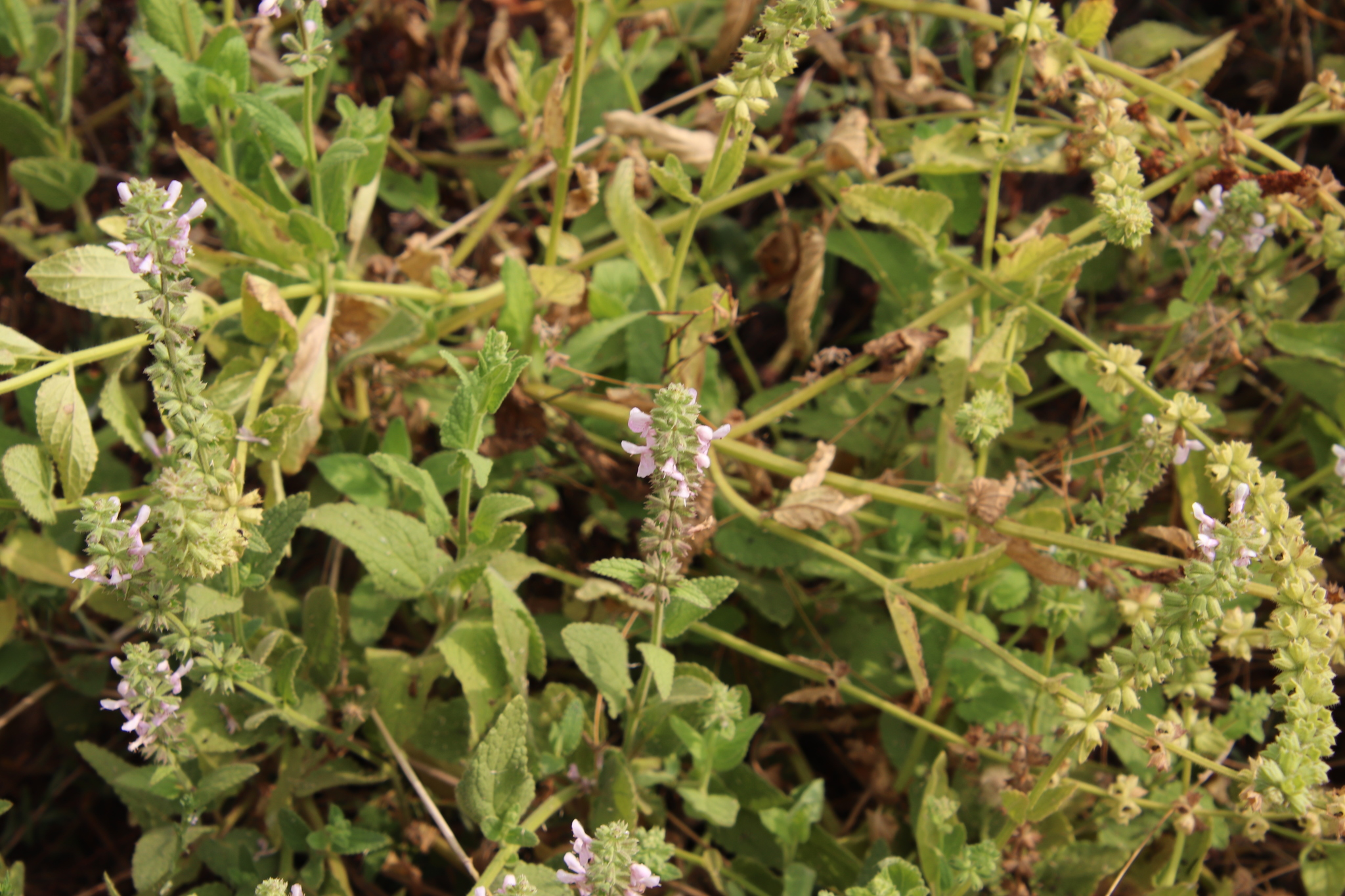

Scientific classification
- Kingdom: Plantae
- Clade: Tracheophytes
- Clade: Angiosperms
- Clade: Eudicots
- Clade: Asterids
- Order: Lamiales
- Family: Lamiaceae
- Genus: Stachys
- Species: S. stebbinsii

Binomial name
- Stachys stebbinsii G.A. Mulligan & D.B. Munro 1989

= Stachys stebbinsii =

Stebbins' hedgenettle

Species of plant

Stachys stebbinsii is a species of perennial herb in the mint family commonly known as Stebbins' hedgenettle. This plant is characterized by a musky aroma, flowers with large lower lips, and glandular hairs that densely cover the stems. S. stebbinsii is native to California and northwestern Baja California. It is usually found growing in moist places in a wide variety of habitats including disturbed areas, chaparral, coastal sage scrub and mountains.

== Description ==
Stachys stebbinsii is a rhizomatous perennial herb. The leaves, upper stems, and calyx are abundantly covered in dense, yellowish, sticky, mostly glandular hairs that emit a strong musky odor. The size of the lower lip on the corolla, the strong odor, the cordate leaves, and the dense glandular hairs on the stem distinguish this species from Stachys rigida and Stachys ajugoides.

The rhizomes are white and fleshy, 5–10 mm (0.20–0.39 in) thick. The stems are erect and grow up to 1.5 m (4.9 ft) tall, and are generally robust in habit, covered in a sticky resin. The petioles measure up to 5–6 cm (2.0–2.4 in) long. The leaves are shaped broadly lanceolate to narrowly cordate, with an acute tip, measuring 10–12 cm (3.9–4.7 in) long by 4–5 cm (1.6–2.0 in) wide. The leaf base is shaped truncate to strongly cordate, and the leaf margins have a prominent scalloped edge.

The inflorescences are 6-flowered clusters. On the flower, the calyx tube measures 4–5 mm (0.16–0.20 in) long, with the individual lobes measuring 2.5–3 mm (0.098–0.118 in) long. The corolla is a whitish, pale-pink to pink and is 8–9 mm (0.31–0.35 in) long. The corolla is labiate, with a small upper lip and a larger lower lip measuring 7.5–8.5 mm (0.30–0.33 in) long by 6–10 mm (0.24–0.39 in) wide. The seeds are dark brown to black in color and measure 2 mm (0.079 in) by 1.5 mm (0.059 in).

== Taxonomy ==
Stachys stebbinsii was described by Gerald A. Mulligan and Derek B. Munro in their 1989 treatment on the Stachys species of North America. Before it was described, S. stebbinsii was usually included under Stachys rigida or Stachys ajugoides var. rigida. The chromosome number is 2n = 66.

Stachys stebbinsii is named after G. Ledyard Stebbins.

== Distribution and habitat ==
=== Distribution ===
Stachys stebbinsii is native to western California and Baja California. In California, it is found from the San Francisco area south to San Diego County. Localities mentioned in the type description include Lake Merced, areas in Napa County, Berry Canyon in Butte County, San Luis Obispo, the Santa Ana River, the Santa Ana Mountains in Orange County, the San Jacinto Mountains and Elsinore in Riverside County, and San Diego County. In Baja California, it is rarely found from Tijuana south to El Rosario, but is most abundant in the Sierra de San Pedro Martir.

=== Habitat ===
Stachys stebbinsii is usually found in moist or wet environments in a variety of habitats. This includes areas along water courses, near wetlands and waterbodies, and roadside ditches. In Baja California, habitats include coastal sage scrub, chaparral, and the various environments of the California Floristic Province part of the Peninsular Ranges. Substrates S. stebbinsii is usually associated with include humus and seepage soils, but also sand, gravel, or other substrates across its range where moisture is plentiful.

== Gallery ==
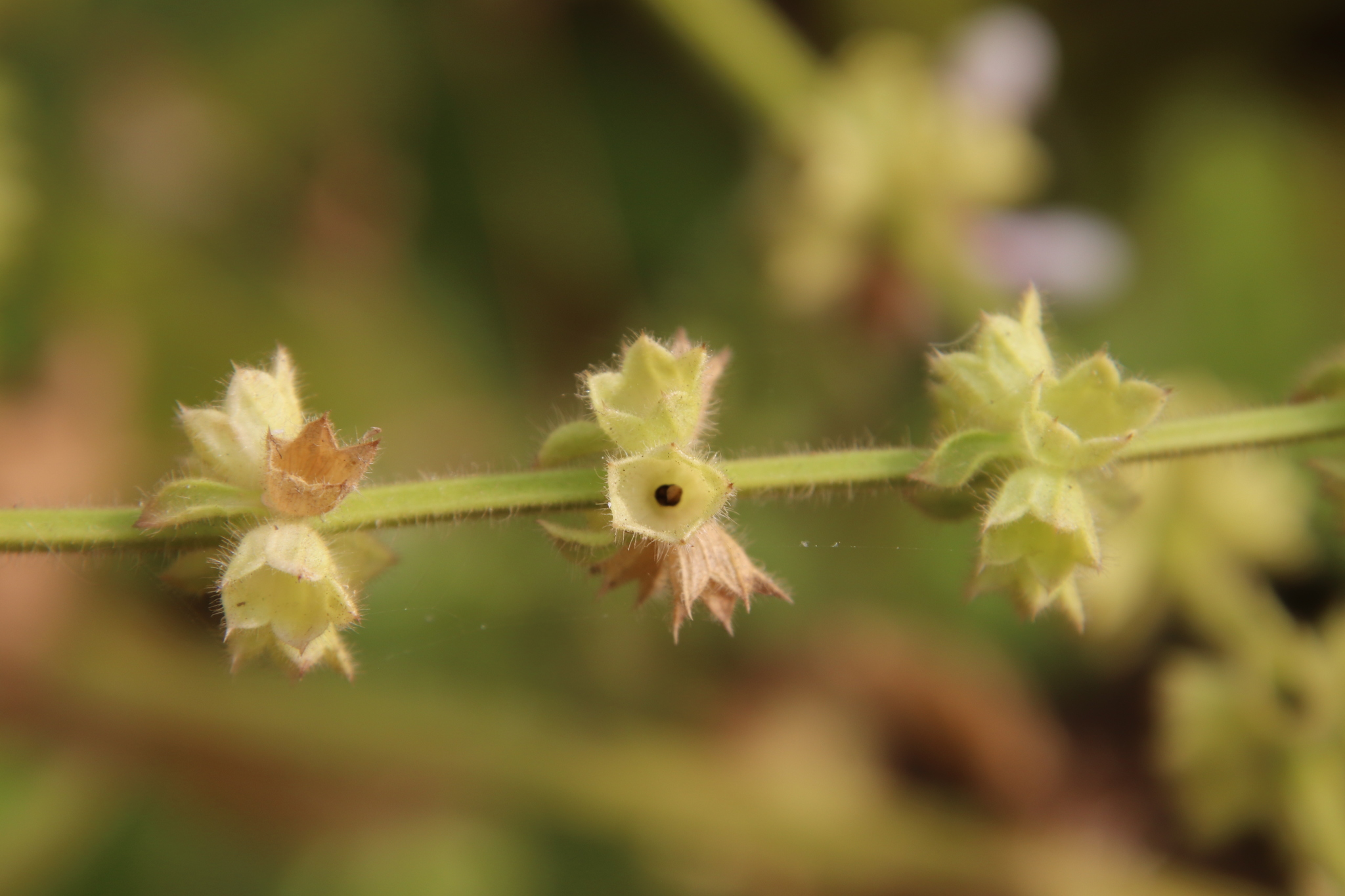
A seed within the mature calyx

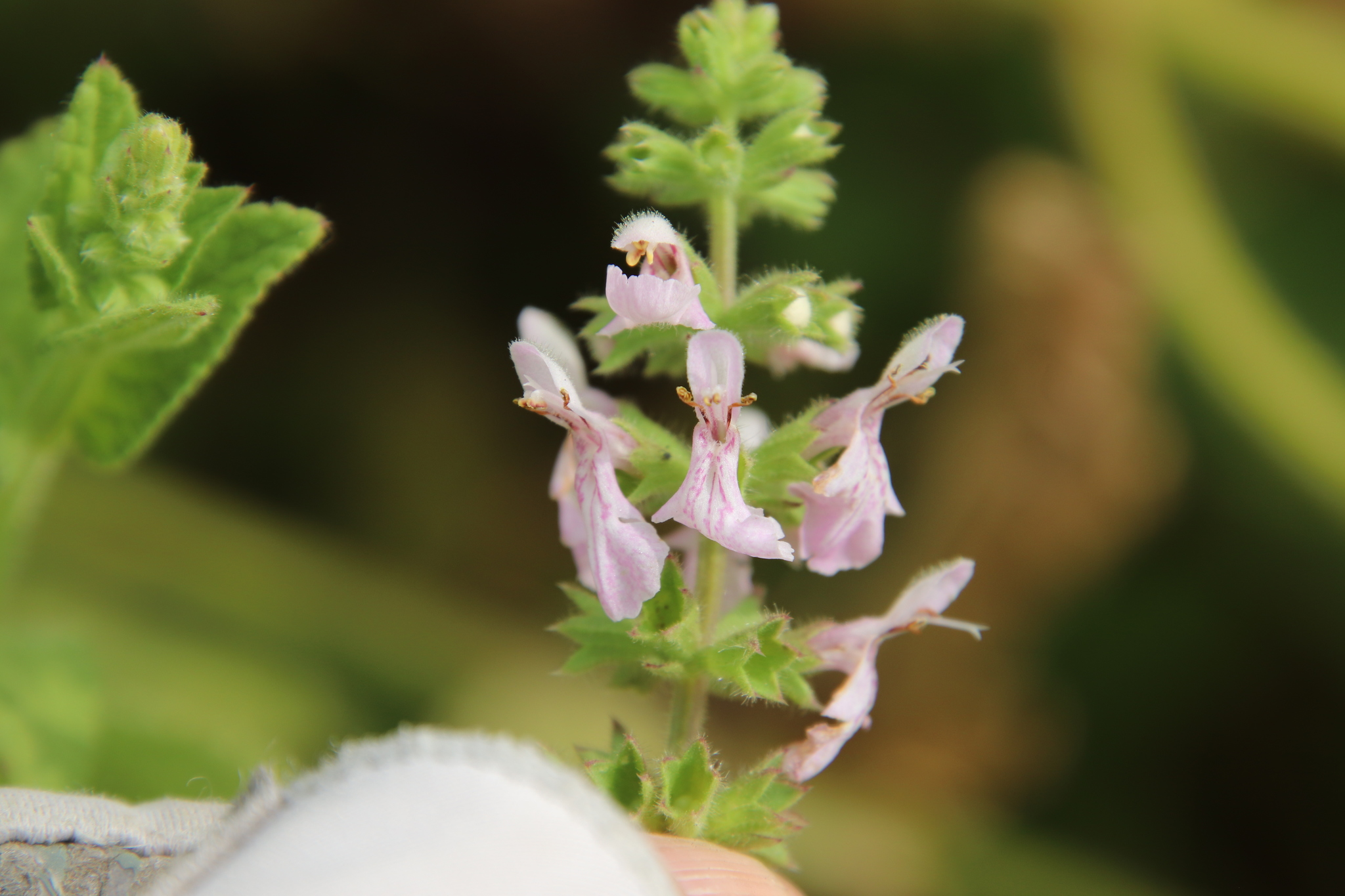
Detail of the flowers and inflorescence

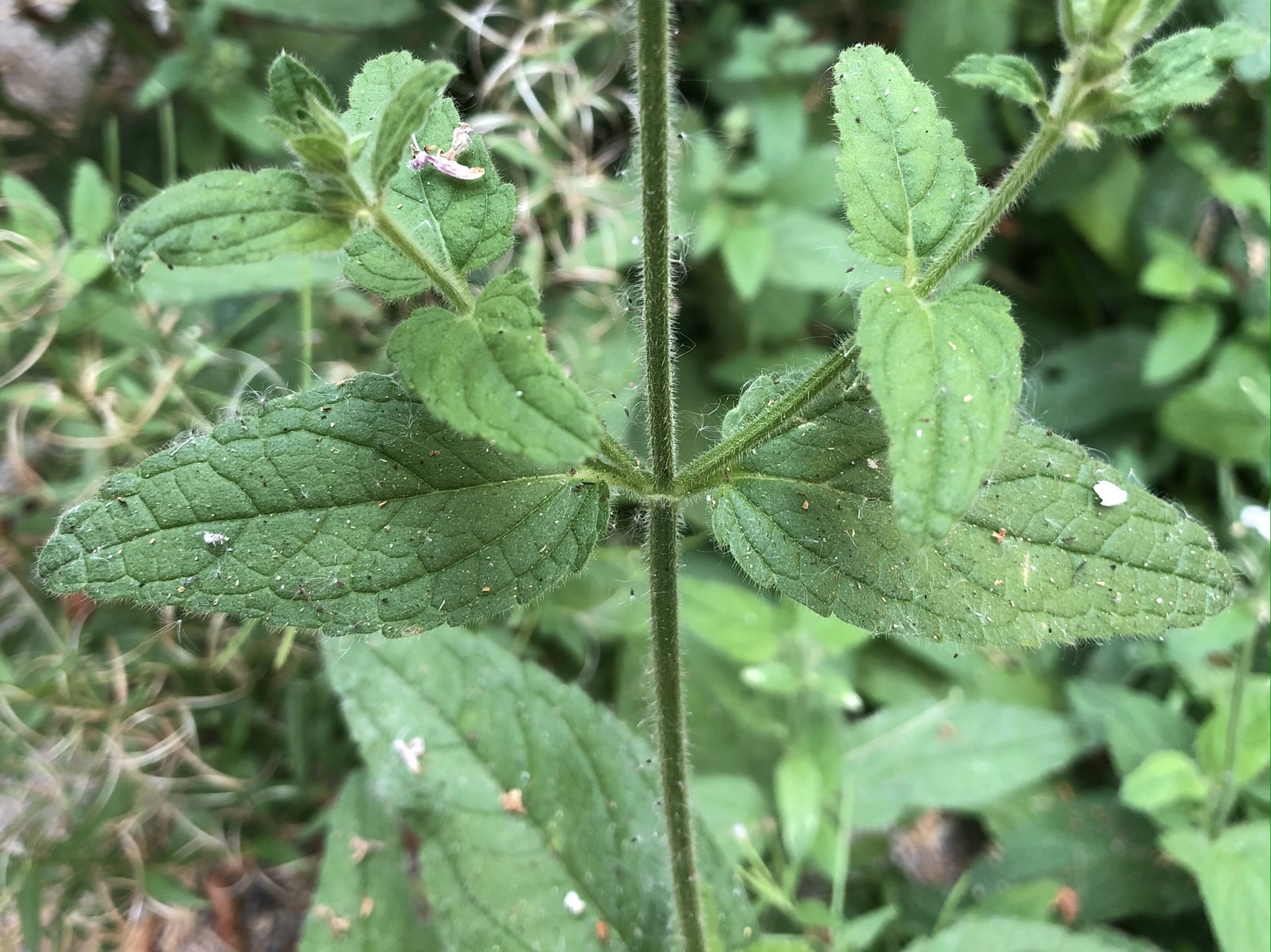
Detail of the stems and leaves

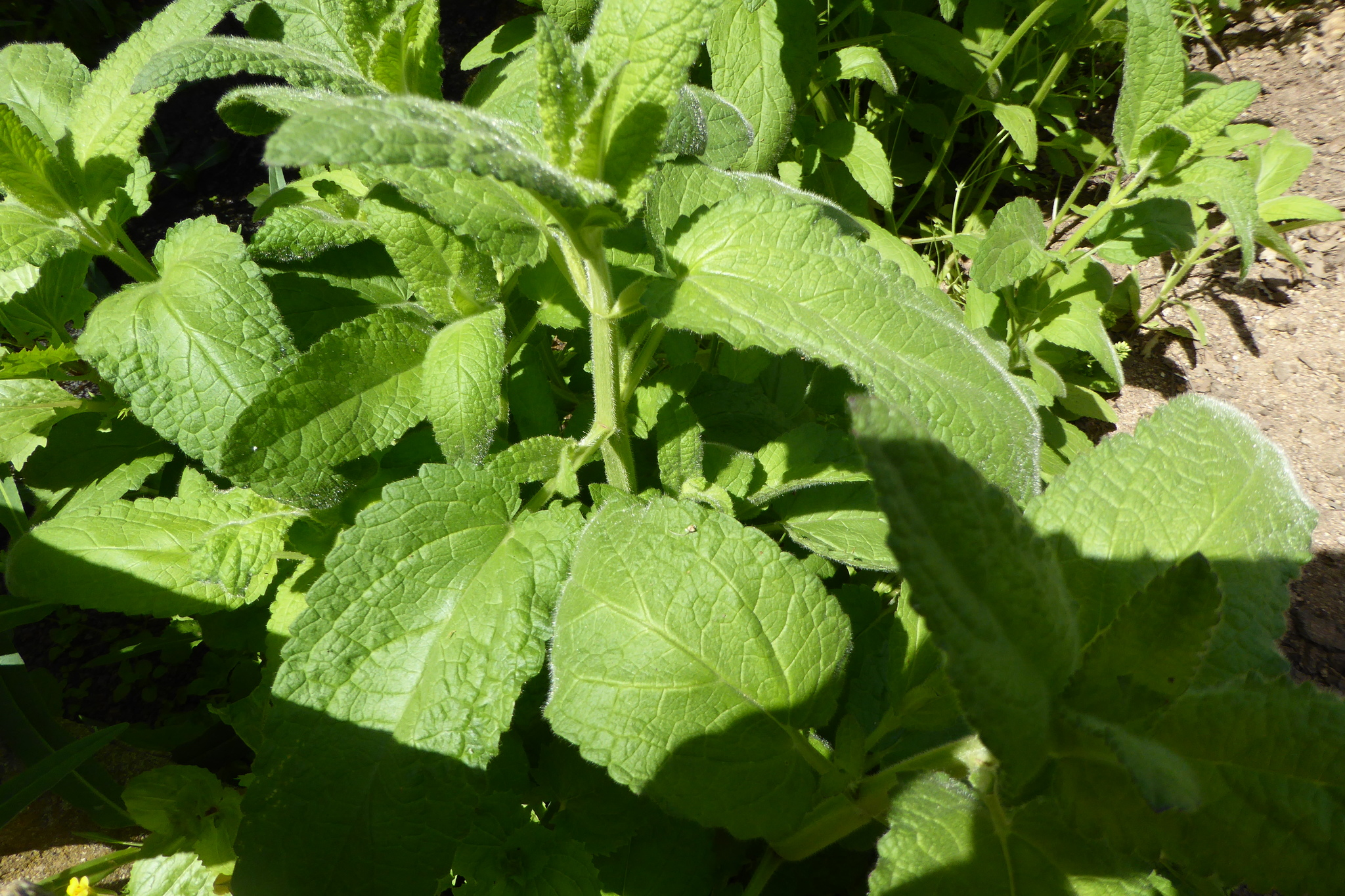
The foliage

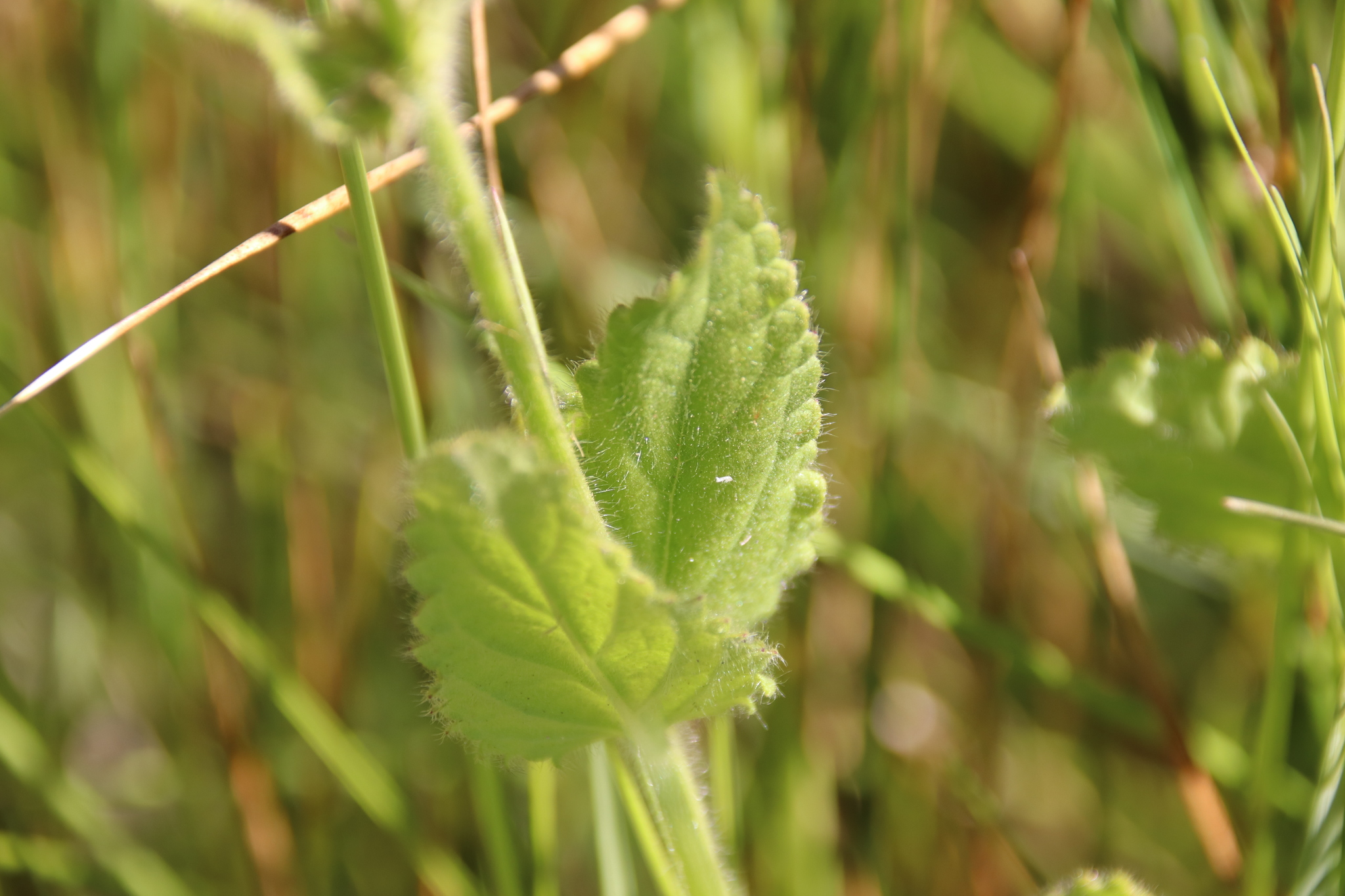
The leaves and stems. Note the hairs

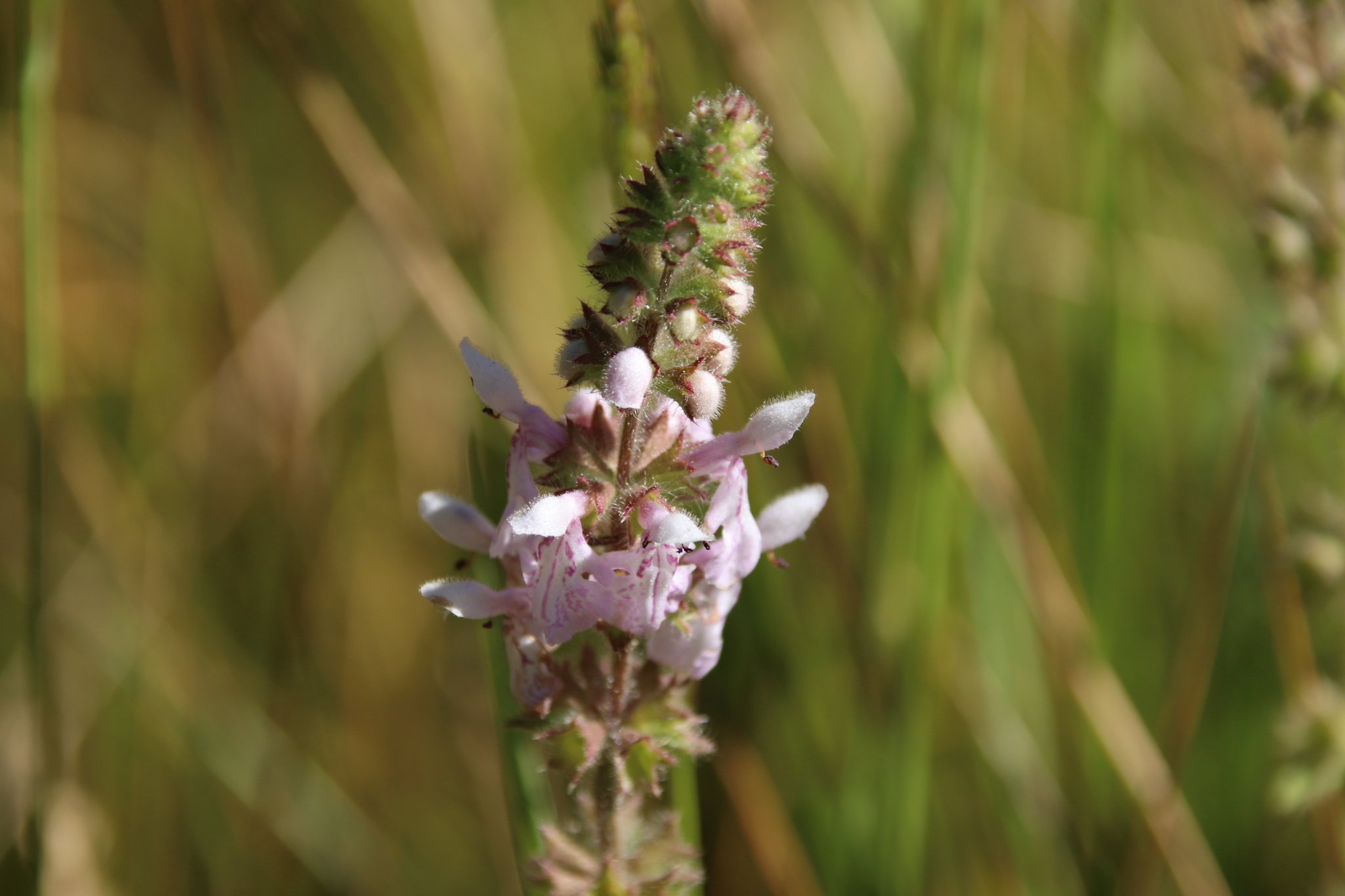
A nascent inflorescence with some flowers emerging
