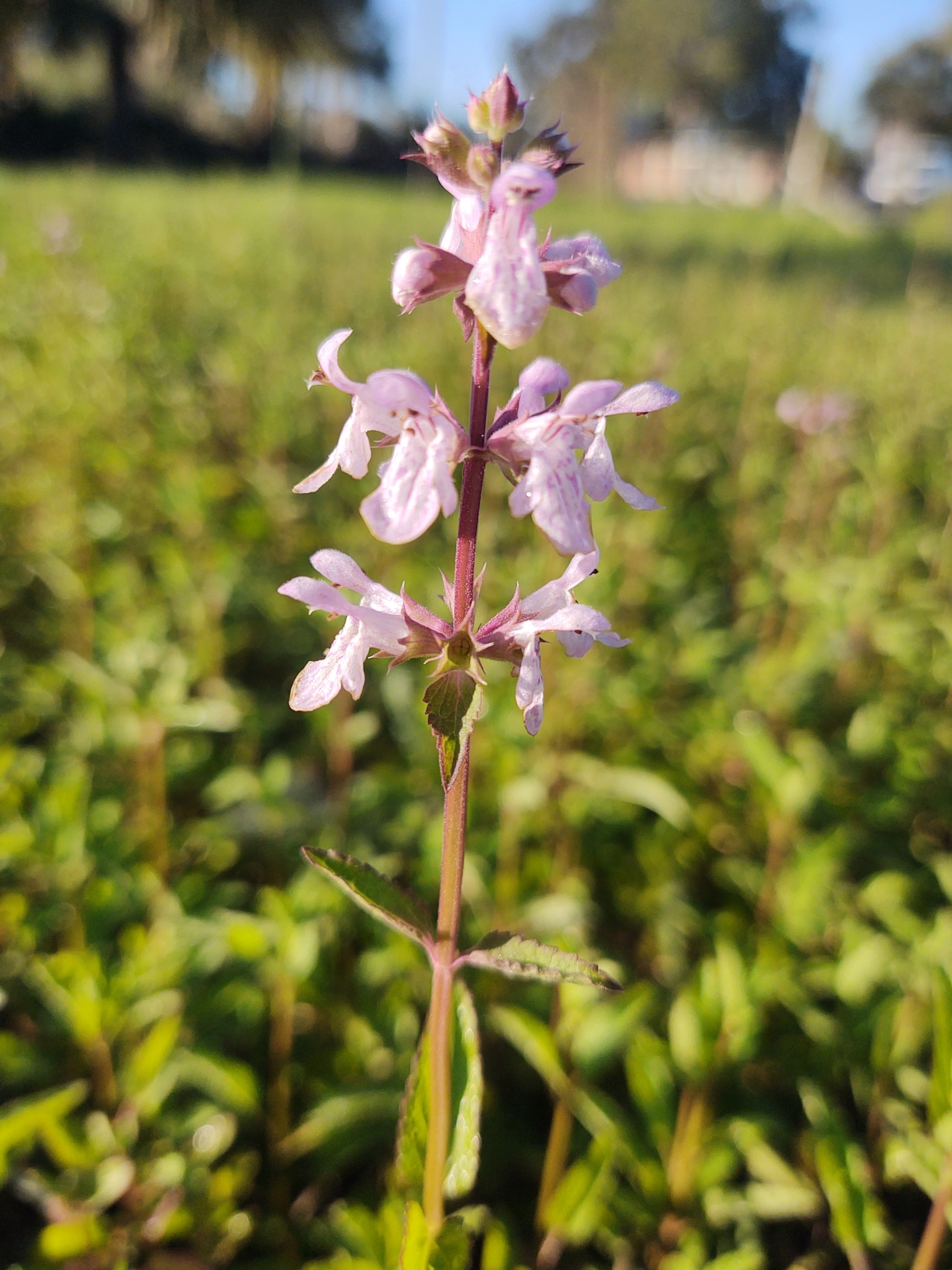

Conservation status
- Secure (NatureServe)

Scientific classification
- Kingdom: Plantae
- Clade: Tracheophytes
- Clade: Angiosperms
- Clade: Eudicots
- Clade: Asterids
- Order: Lamiales
- Family: Lamiaceae
- Genus: Stachys
- Species: S. floridana

Binomial name
- Stachys floridana Shuttlew. ex Benth.

= Stachys floridana =

Species of flowering plant

Stachys floridana is a species of betony in the mint family, Lamiaceae. It is native to the United States, where its true native range is probably limited to Florida, but today it is known throughout the Southeast as an introduced species and common weed. It occurs as far west as Texas, and it has been recorded in California. Its common names include Florida betony, Florida hedgenettle, and rattlesnake weed. It has been called wild artichoke, but it is not closely related to artichoke. The plant was the Florida Department of Agriculture's "Weed of the Month" for February 2010.

== Description ==
This species is a perennial herb producing a hairy, erect stem up to about half a meter in maximum height. It grows from a network of rhizomes with tubers. The distinctive pale-colored tuber is several centimeters long and about one centimeter wide, and is segmented in such a way that it resembles the rattle on the tail of a rattlesnake, the inspiration for the common name "rattlesnake weed". The tuber is also said to resemble "a fat grub". The tuber can reportedly grow up to one meter long in sandy soils. The oppositely arranged leaves have blades up to 5.5 centimeters long borne on petioles up to 3.5 centimeters long. Flowers grow in clusters of 3 to 6 from the upper leaf axils. The tubular, hairy calyx of sepals has pointed lobes. The two-lipped corolla is up to 1.3 centimeters long and white to pink with purple spots or darker lines. The fruit is a schizocarp a few centimeters long that splits in half. The seeds are about a millimeter long.

== Biology ==
The plant is a prolific producer of seeds, but it often undergoes vegetative reproduction via its rhizome and tubers. Small segments of rhizome can sprout into new plants, and the transport of the tuber to new areas may be the most common way the plant spreads. The plant grows in disturbed habitat types, such as roadsides, often on wet soils. It grows in turf and in beds of ornamental plants.

== Impact ==
The plant was considered to be a Florida endemic until the 1940s and 1950s, when it began to spread throughout the southeastern United States. Its rhizome system extends easily into the loose soils of cultivated ground, and it became a weed of residential and commercial land. It can be found in lawns and other turfgrass, especially centipedegrass and St. Augustine grass. It is a weed of ornamentals, where it can be harder to control than in lawns, because fewer herbicides are approved for use on ornamental herbs and shrubs than on turfgrasses. It is one of the worst weeds of the cultivated ornamental leatherleaf fern (Rumohra adiantiformis). Weed control in ornamentals may require hand-pulling, with careful removal of all the tubers.

== Uses ==
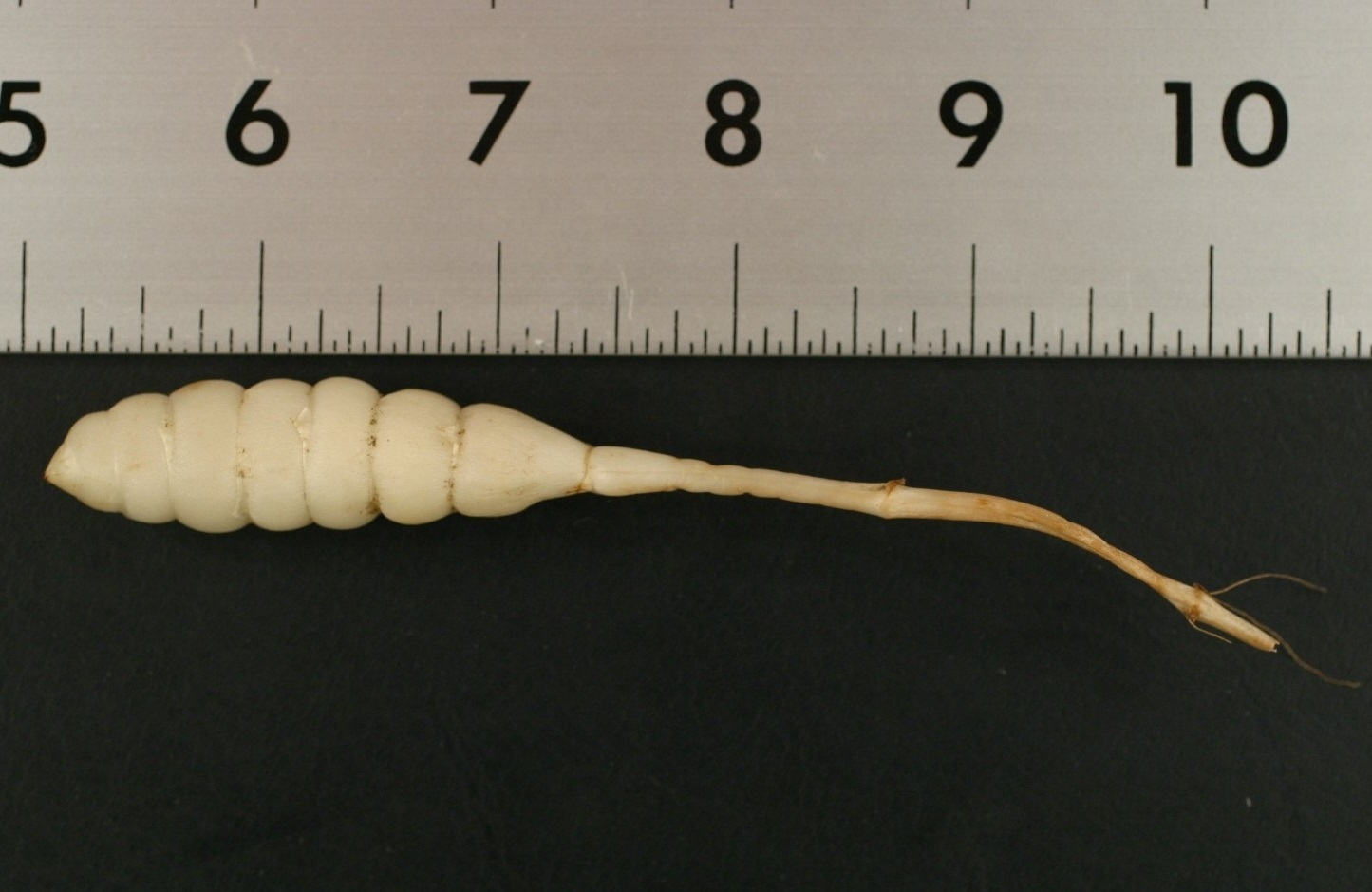
Tuber

Much like its relative, the Chinese artichoke, the "crisp, succulent" tuber is edible, and has "a pleasingly crunchy texture and a bland, slightly sweet taste".
