= Crosne =

Crosne may refer to:

- Crosne, Essonne, a commune in Essonne, France
- Stachys affinis, a species of Chinese betony with edible rhizomes, sometimes referred to as a "crosne," after the French commune, where it was first cultivated in France
