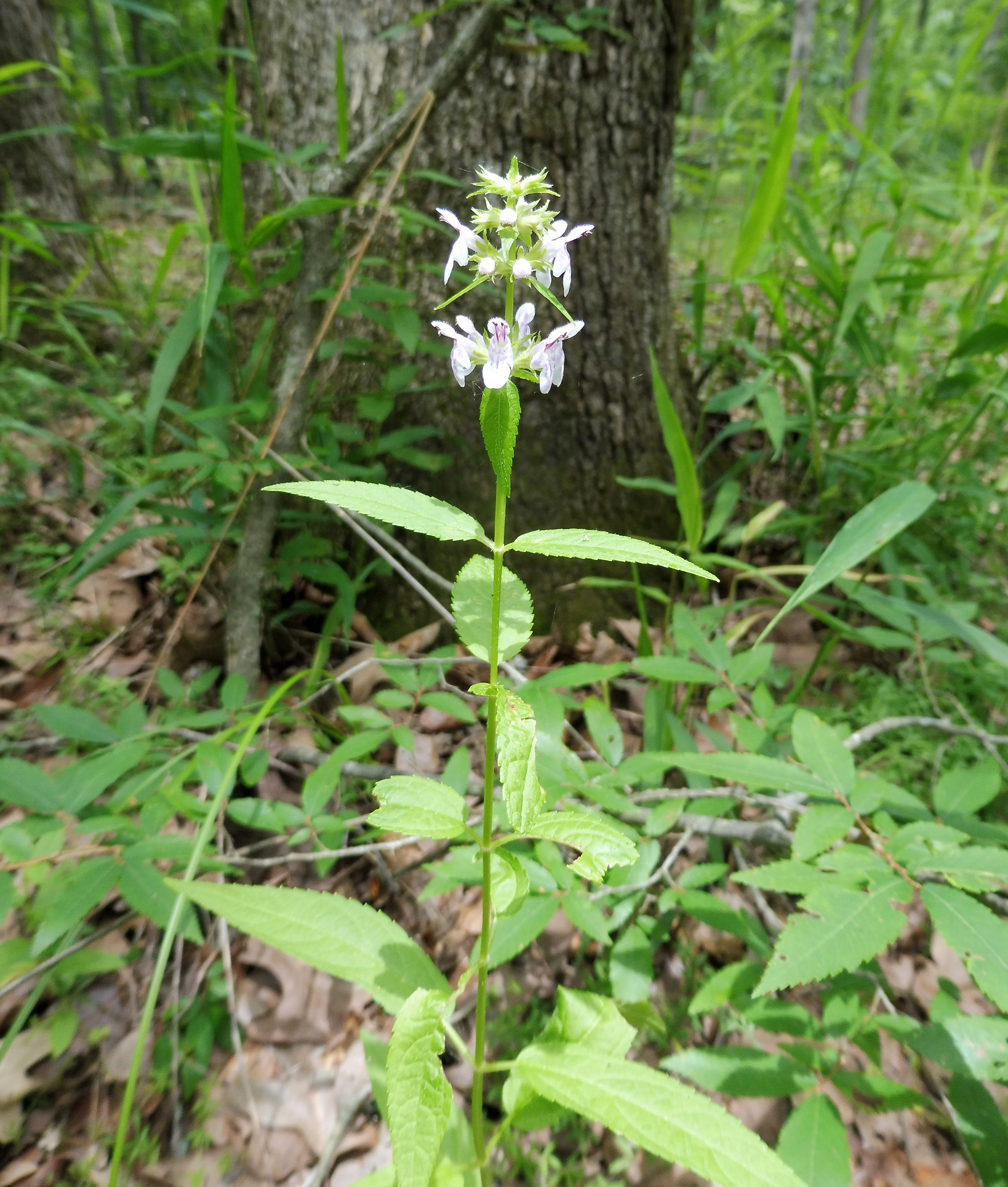

Scientific classification
- Kingdom: Plantae
- Clade: Tracheophytes
- Clade: Angiosperms
- Clade: Eudicots
- Clade: Asterids
- Order: Lamiales
- Family: Lamiaceae
- Genus: Stachys
- Species: S. hispida

Binomial name
- Stachys hispida Pursh

= Stachys hispida =

Species of flowering plant

Stachys hispida, commonly known as hispid hedgenettle, is a species of flowering plant in the mint family (Lamiaceae). It is native to eastern North America, where it is found in Canada and the United States. Its natural habitat is in moist areas, such as alluvial banks, bottomland forests, and wet meadows.

Stachys hispida is a perennial that produces purple and white flowers in mid-summer. It appears to be very close to Stachys tenuifolia, which it was historically considered a variety of. S. hispida is distinguished by its more pubescent leaves, stem, and calyx, and usually unbranching stem.

The taxonomy of Stachys in the eastern United States remains poorly understood, and is subject to ongoing investigations. Four new species of Stachys have been described out of the Southeast in the 2010s alone.
