= Stachys manantlanensis =

Scientific classification
- Kingdom: Plantae
- Clade: Tracheophytes
- Clade: Angiosperms
- Clade: Eudicots
- Clade: Asterids
- Order: Lamiales
- Family: Lamiaceae
- Genus: Stachys
- Species: S. manantlanensis

Binomial name
- Stachys manantlanensis B.L. Turner

Species of flowering plant

Stachys manantlanensis is a plant species endemic to the Mexican State of Jalisco. It grows in mountainous areas in the Rincón de Manantlán west of Guadalajara at elevations of 1900–2200 m.

Stachys manantlanensis is a low spindly herb up to 40 cm high, some of the lateral branches rooting at the nodes. Leaves ovate, up to 10 cm long. Flowers in groups of 2–6 in the axils of the upper leaves, bright magenta to lilac, up to 20 mm long.
