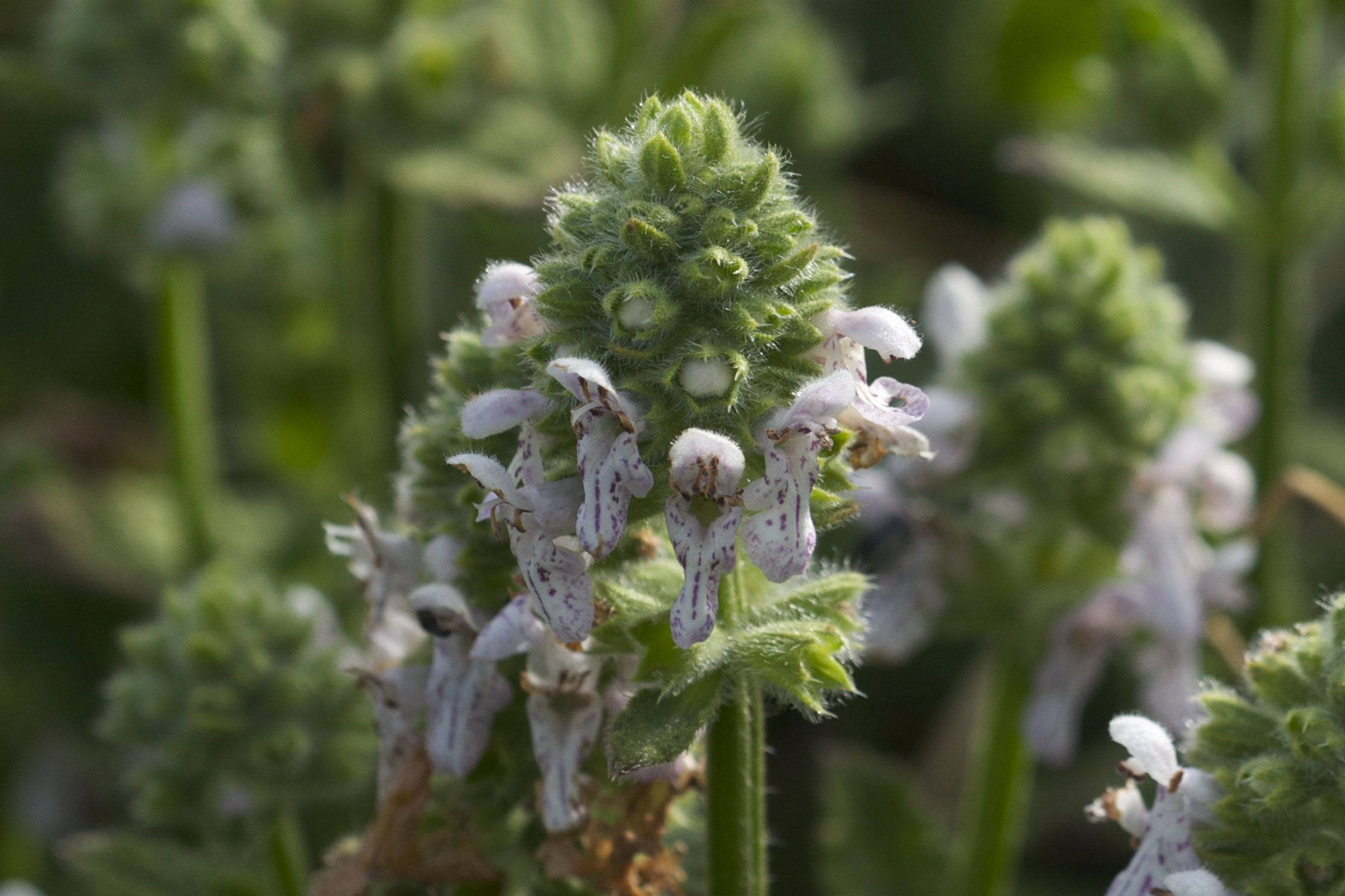

Scientific classification
- Kingdom: Plantae
- Clade: Tracheophytes
- Clade: Angiosperms
- Clade: Eudicots
- Clade: Asterids
- Order: Lamiales
- Family: Lamiaceae
- Genus: Stachys
- Species: S. pycnantha

Binomial name
- Stachys pycnantha Benth.

= Stachys pycnantha =

Species of flowering plant

Stachys pycnantha is a species of flowering plant in the mint family known by the common name shortspike hedgenettle. It is native to California, where it is known from many types of mountain and foothill habitat. This mint produces several stems usually exceeding 60 centimeters in height. It is hairy and glandular and very aromatic. The leaves have lance-shaped or oval blades borne on short petioles. The inflorescence is usually a single cluster or interrupted series of a few clusters of flowers, with up to 12 flowers per cluster. The tubular corolla is up to a centimeter long and white to pink in color. It is borne in a hairy calyx of sepals.
