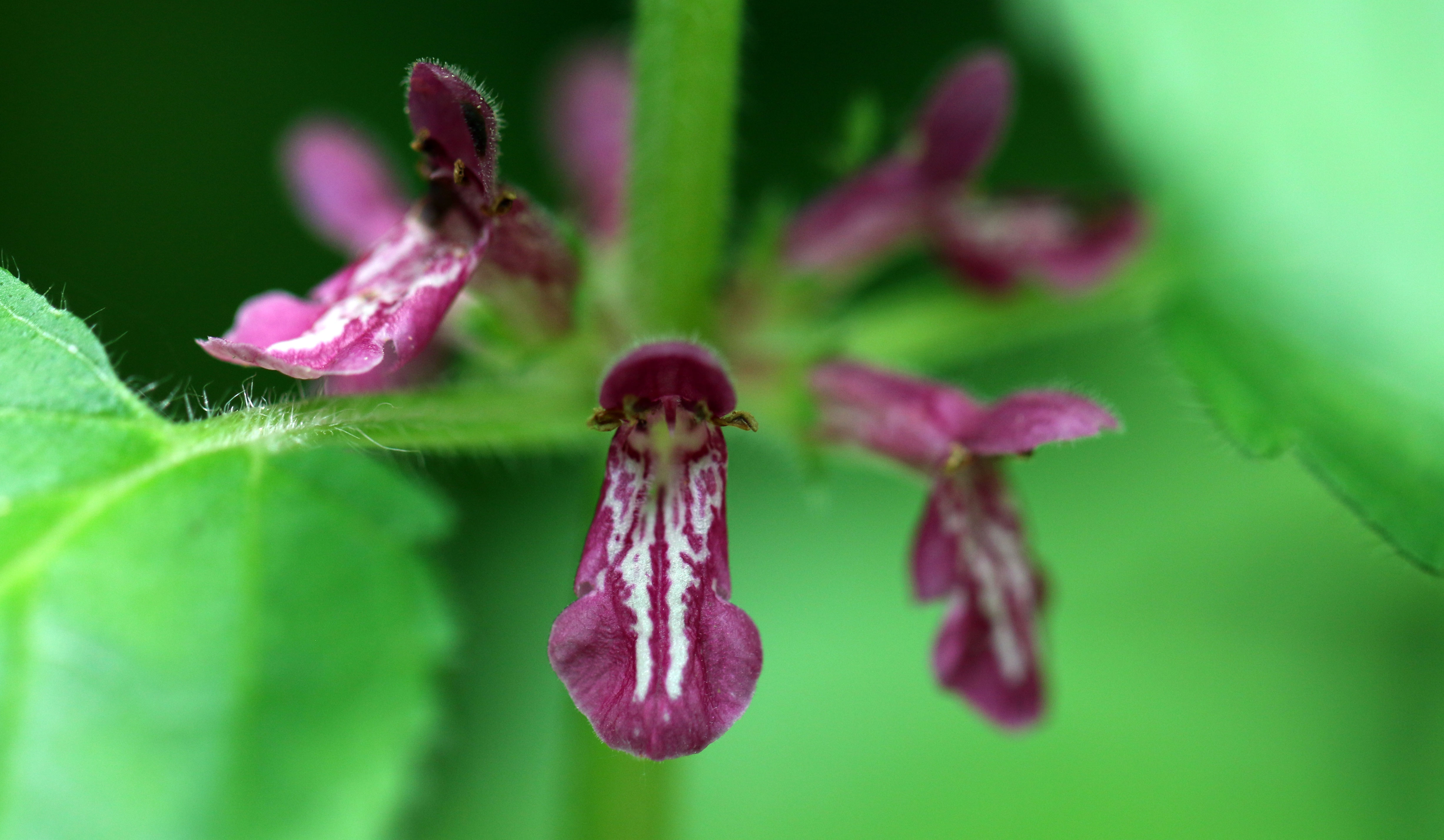

Scientific classification
- Kingdom: Plantae
- Clade: Tracheophytes
- Clade: Angiosperms
- Clade: Eudicots
- Clade: Asterids
- Order: Lamiales
- Family: Lamiaceae
- Genus: Stachys
- Species: S. mexicana

Binomial name
- Stachys mexicana Benth.

= Stachys mexicana =

Species of flowering plant

Stachys mexicana is a species of flowering plant in the mint family (Lamiaceae) native to western United States and Canada.

== Description ==
Stachys mexicana is a perennial herb with opposite leaves and a square stems, characteristic of the mint family. The inflorescences consist of axillary clusters of tubular, bilabiate, reddish-pink corollas inside calyces with broadly triangular lobes. Crushed leaves and stems have a rank odor typical of many Stachys species. Stachys mexicana is often confused with Stachys cooleyae (which has longer, magenta corollas).

== Distribution and habitat ==
According to Plants of the World Online, Stachys mexicana is restricted to the westernmost states/provinces/territories of the continental United States and Canada. Specific habitat preferences (e.g., elevation range, soil types) are not fully documented in the sources currently cited.

== Taxonomy ==
The name Stachys mexicana was published by George Bentham in 1834 and is currently recognized by POWO. The genus Stachys encompasses a large group of species commonly known as woundworts or hedgenettles, distributed widely in temperate and tropical regions.
