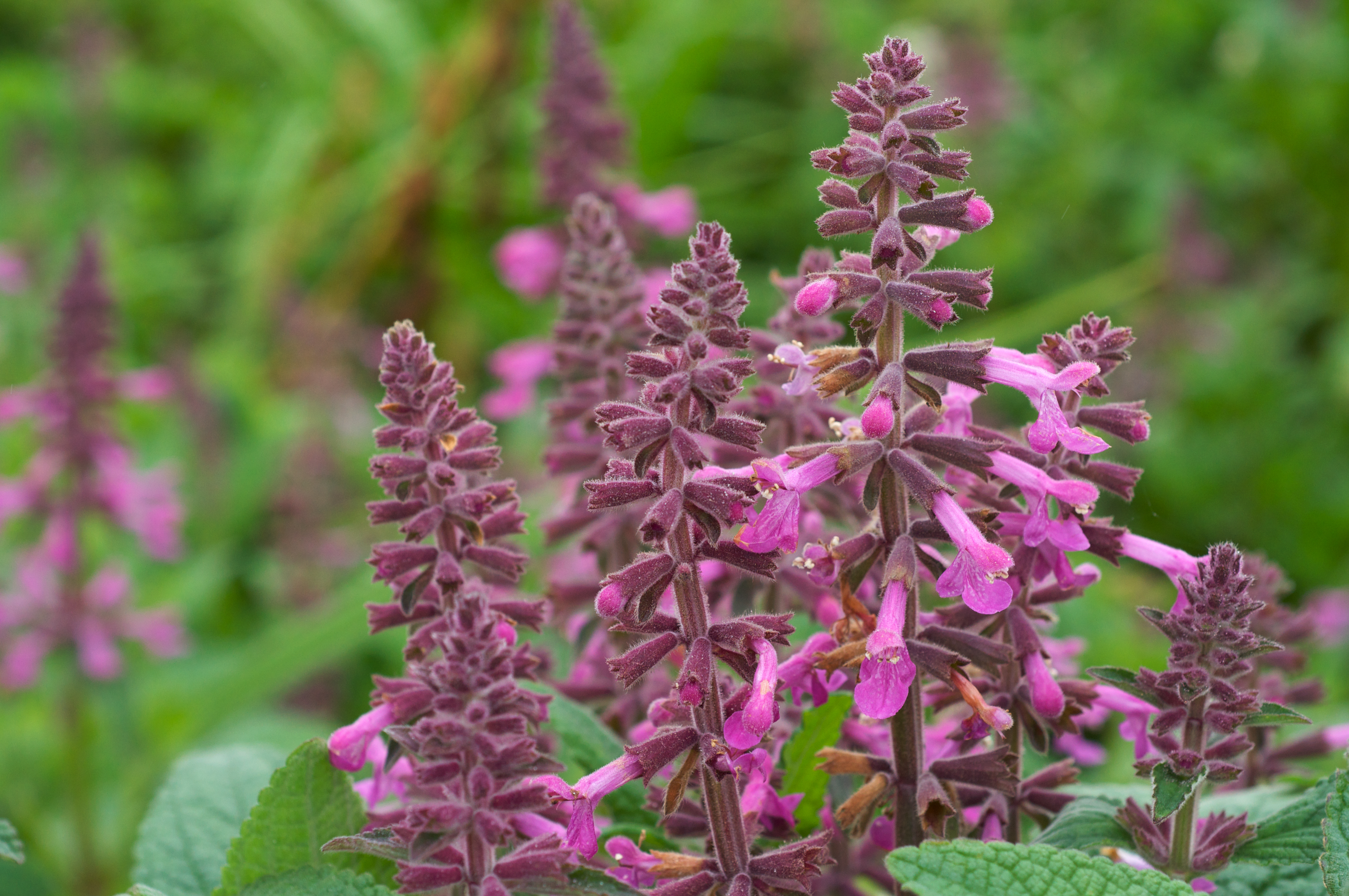

Scientific classification
- Kingdom: Plantae
- Clade: Tracheophytes
- Clade: Angiosperms
- Clade: Eudicots
- Clade: Asterids
- Order: Lamiales
- Family: Lamiaceae
- Genus: Stachys
- Species: S. chamissonis

Binomial name
- Stachys chamissonis Benth.

Varieties
- Stachys chamissonis var. chamissonis; Stachys chamissonis var. cooleyae (A.Heller) G.A.Mulligan & D.B.Munro

= Stachys chamissonis =

Plant species in the mint family

Stachys chamissonis is a species of flowering plant in the mint family known by the common name coastal hedgenettle. It is a perennial herb native to the west coast of North America, where it grows in moist coastal habitat from Alaska to central California. This mint produces an erect stem 1 to 2 1/2 meters (3.3 to 8.2 ft). It is hairy, glandular, and aromatic. The oppositely arranged leaves have pointed, wavy-edged blades up to 18 centimeters (7.1 in) long which are borne on petioles. The hairy, glandular inflorescence is made up of interrupted clusters of up to six flowers each. The flower has a deep pink tubular corolla which can be over 3 centimeters (1.2 in) long. The corollas are borne in hairy calyces of purple or purple-tinged sepals.

== Taxonomy ==
Stachys chamissonis was scientifically described by George Bentham in 1831. It has two accepted varieties.

=== Stachys chamissonis var. chamissonis ===
The autonymic variety of the species only grows in California.

=== Stachys chamissonis var. cooleyae ===
This variety grows in a wider area, from British Columbia to California.
