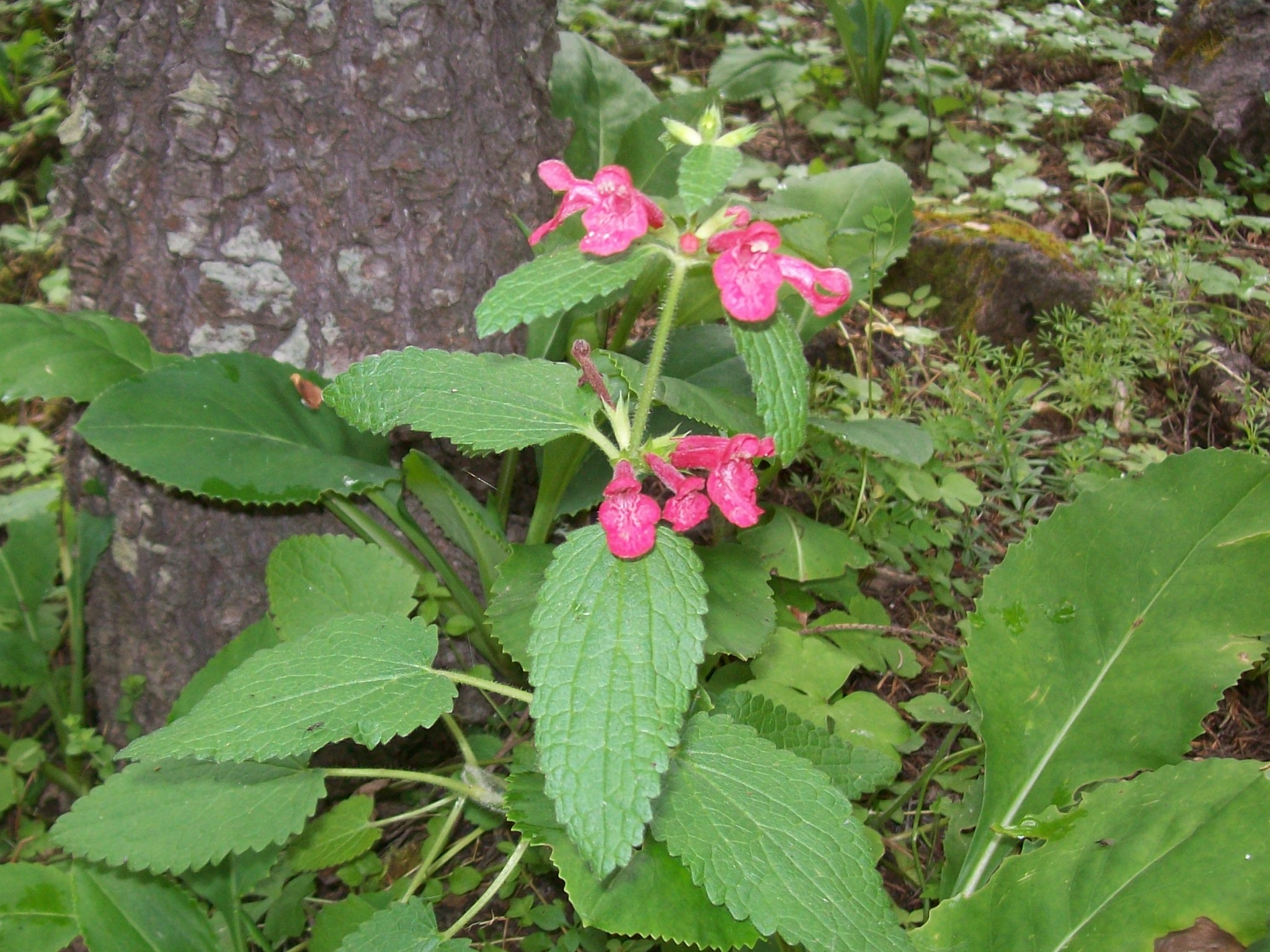

Scientific classification
- Kingdom: Plantae
- Clade: Tracheophytes
- Clade: Angiosperms
- Clade: Eudicots
- Clade: Asterids
- Order: Lamiales
- Family: Lamiaceae
- Genus: Stachys
- Species: S. coccinea

Binomial name
- Stachys coccinea Jacq.

= Stachys coccinea =

Species of flowering plant

Stachys coccinea, the scarlet hedgenettle or Texas betony, is an ornamental plant of the family Lamiaceae, which is native from Arizona to Texas and from Baja California Sur, Mexico to Nicaragua.

Some cultivars of this species include:

- Stachys coccinea 'Chinook' - long blooming plants, coral-red colored flowers, plants grow around 40 cm (15 in) tall.
- Stachys coccinea 'Hidalgo' - coral-red flowers, grows 30–45 cm (12–18 in) tall, sometimes listed under Stachys albotomentosa.
- Stachys coccinea 'Hot Spot Coral' - coral-red colored flowers, plants grow 45 cm (18 in) tall.
- Stachys coccinea 'Pow Wow' - brick-red colored flowers on plants growing about 30 cm (12 in) tall.
