= Stachys debilis =

Conservation status
- Near Threatened (IUCN 3.1)

Scientific classification
- Kingdom: Plantae
- Clade: Tracheophytes
- Clade: Angiosperms
- Clade: Eudicots
- Clade: Asterids
- Order: Lamiales
- Family: Lamiaceae
- Genus: Stachys
- Species: S. debilis

Binomial name
- Stachys debilis Kunth
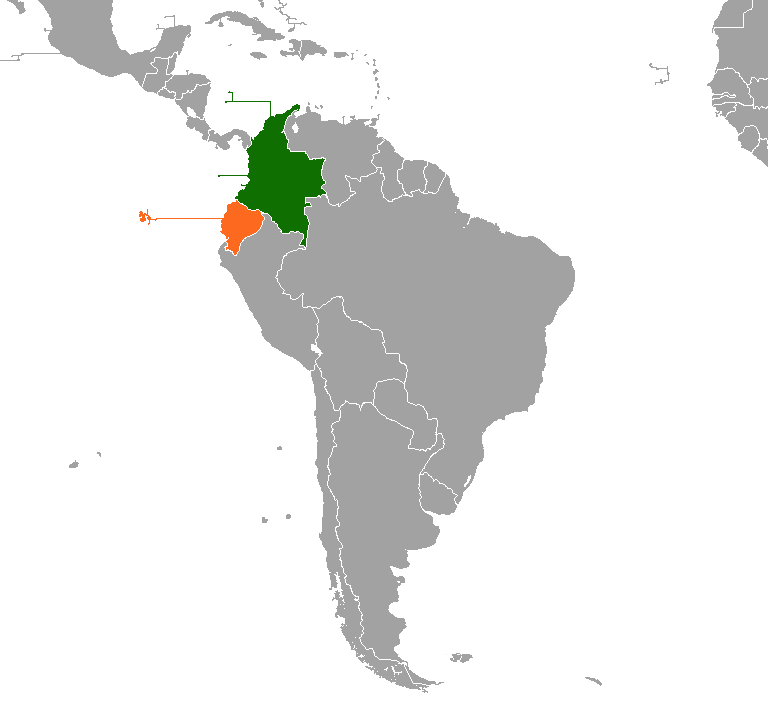
- Stachys debilis is native to Colombia and Ecuador

Species of flowering plant

Stachys debilis is a species of flowering plant in the family Lamiaceae. It is found only in Ecuador. Its natural habitats are subtropical or tropical moist montane forests, subtropical or tropical high-altitude shrubland, and subtropical or tropical high-altitude grassland.

== Taxonomy ==
=== Publication ===
It was published by Carl Sigismund Kunth in 1818.

== Etymology ==
The specific epithet debilis means weak.
