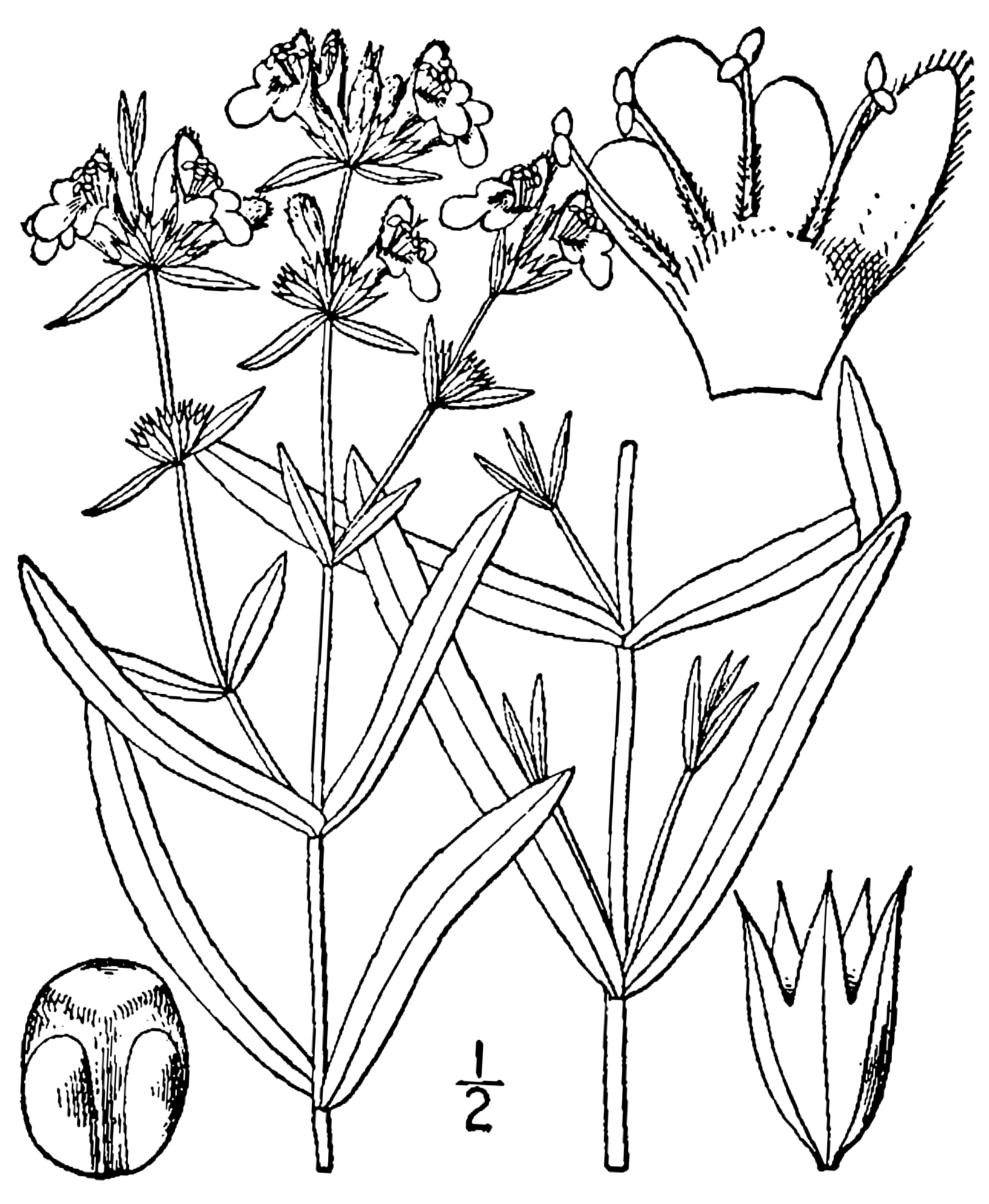

Conservation status
- Apparently Secure (NatureServe)

Scientific classification
- Kingdom: Plantae
- Clade: Tracheophytes
- Clade: Angiosperms
- Clade: Eudicots
- Clade: Asterids
- Order: Lamiales
- Family: Lamiaceae
- Genus: Stachys
- Species: S. hyssopifolia

Binomial name
- Stachys hyssopifolia Michx.

= Stachys hyssopifolia =

Species of flowering plant

Stachys hyssopifolia, commonly known as hyssop-leaf hedge-nettle, rough hedge-nettle hyssop-leaved hedgenettle, and hyssop hedge-nettle is a species of flowering plant in the mint family (Lamiaceae).

== Conservation status in the United States ==
It is listed as endangered in Connecticut, and in Florida. It is also listed as threatened in New York (state) and Rhode Island and as extirpated in Pennsylvania. It is listed on the watch list of MESA, protected under the Massachusetts Endangered Species Act (M.G.L. c. 131A).
