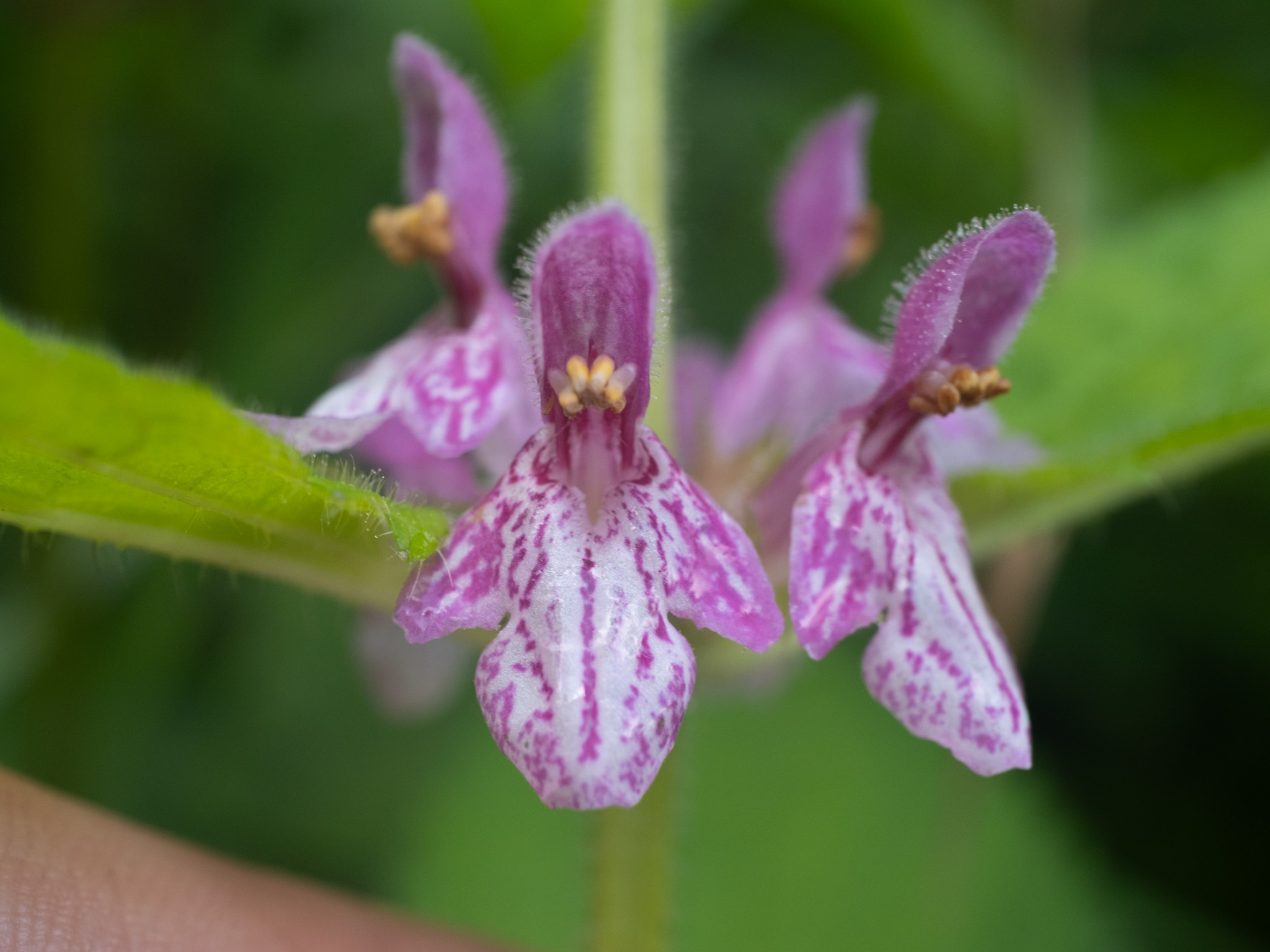

Conservation status
- Imperiled (NatureServe)

Scientific classification
- Kingdom: Plantae
- Clade: Tracheophytes
- Clade: Angiosperms
- Clade: Eudicots
- Clade: Asterids
- Order: Lamiales
- Family: Lamiaceae
- Genus: Stachys
- Species: S. clingmanii

Binomial name
- Stachys clingmanii Small 1903

= Stachys clingmanii =

Clingman's hedgenettle

Species of flowering plant

Stachys clingmanii, or Clingman's hedgenettle, is a North American species of plant in the mint family. It is found at higher elevations in the Great Smoky Mountains of Tennessee and the Carolinas, with additional populations in Illinois, Indiana, and Vermont. It is a threatened species in Tennessee.

Stachys clingmanii is an erect branching herb up to 90 cm (3 feet) tall. It blooms in summer, producing flowers up to 1.5 cm (0.6 inches) long.
