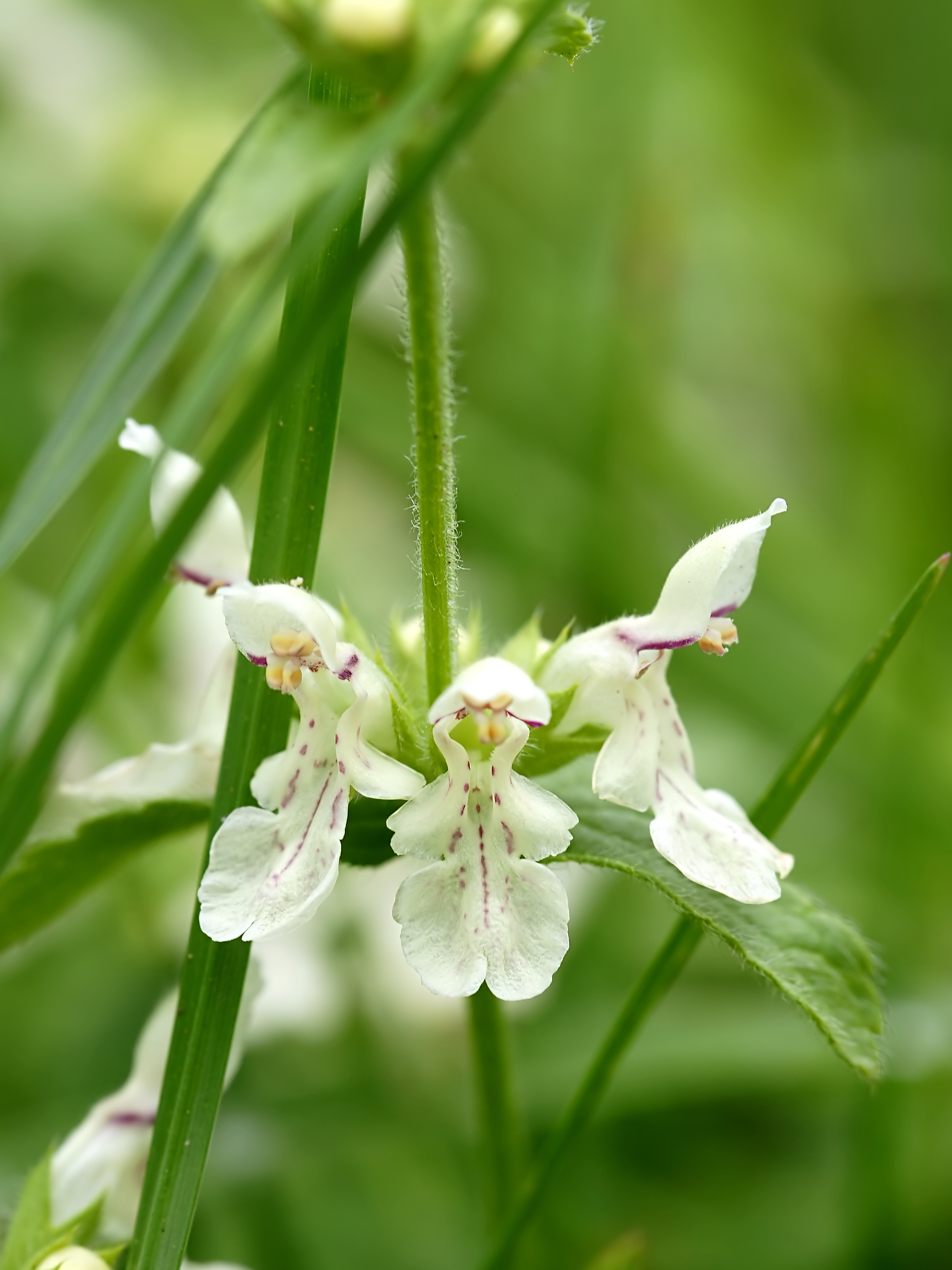
- Flowers
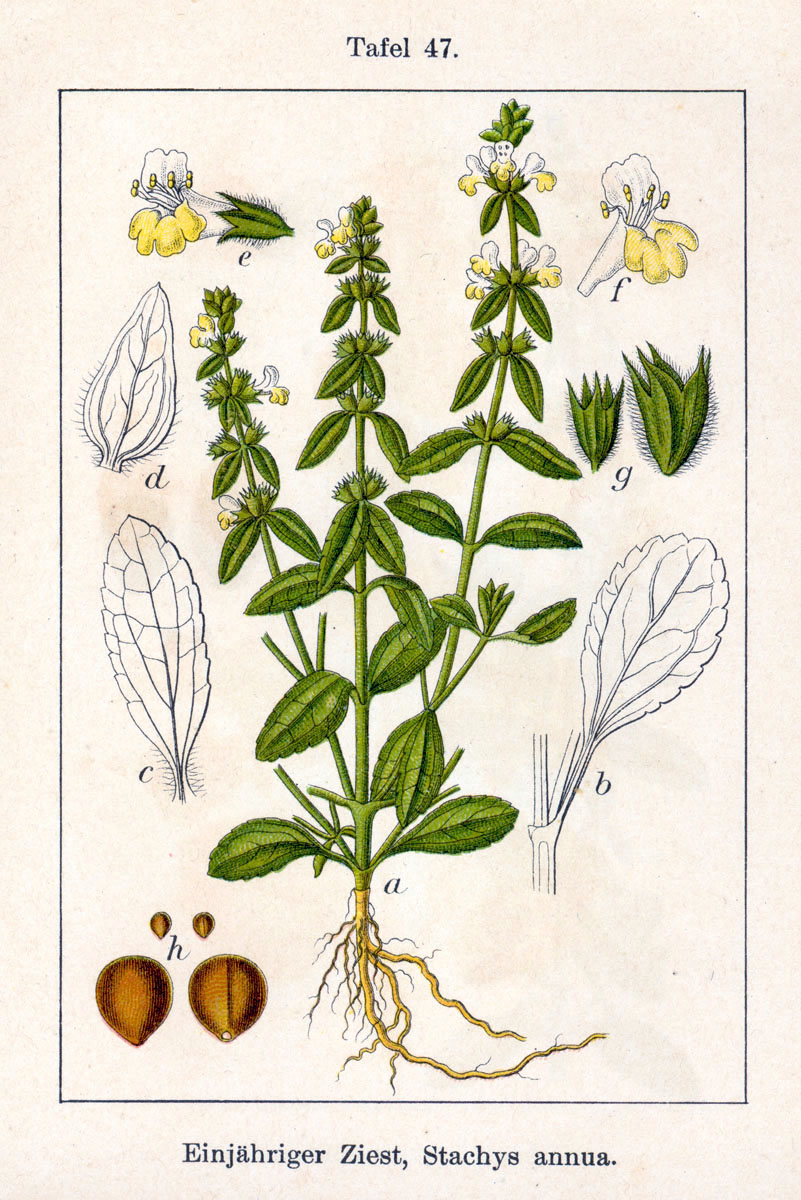
- Botanical illustration

Scientific classification
- Kingdom: Plantae
- Clade: Embryophytes
- Clade: Tracheophytes
- Clade: Angiosperms
- Clade: Eudicots
- Clade: Asterids
- Order: Lamiales
- Family: Lamiaceae
- Genus: Stachys
- Species: S. annua

Binomial name
- Stachys annua (L.) L.

Synonyms
- List: Betonica annua L.; Olisia annua (L.) Fourr.; Prasium stachydium E.H.L.Krause; Stachys betonica Crantz

= Stachys annua =

Species of flowering plant

Stachys annua, called the annual yellow woundwort, is a widespread species of flowering plant in the hedgenettle genus Stachys, native to Europe, the Middle East, and western Siberia, and introduced in Cyprus, eastern North America, and Amur Oblast and Primorsky Krai in far eastern Russia. It is a common plant in fields, road verges and waste places.

== Subspecies ==
The following subspecies are currently accepted:

- Stachys annua subsp. ammophila (Boiss. & Blanche) Sam.
- Stachys annua subsp. annua
- Stachys annua subsp. cilicica (Boiss.) R.Bhattacharjee
