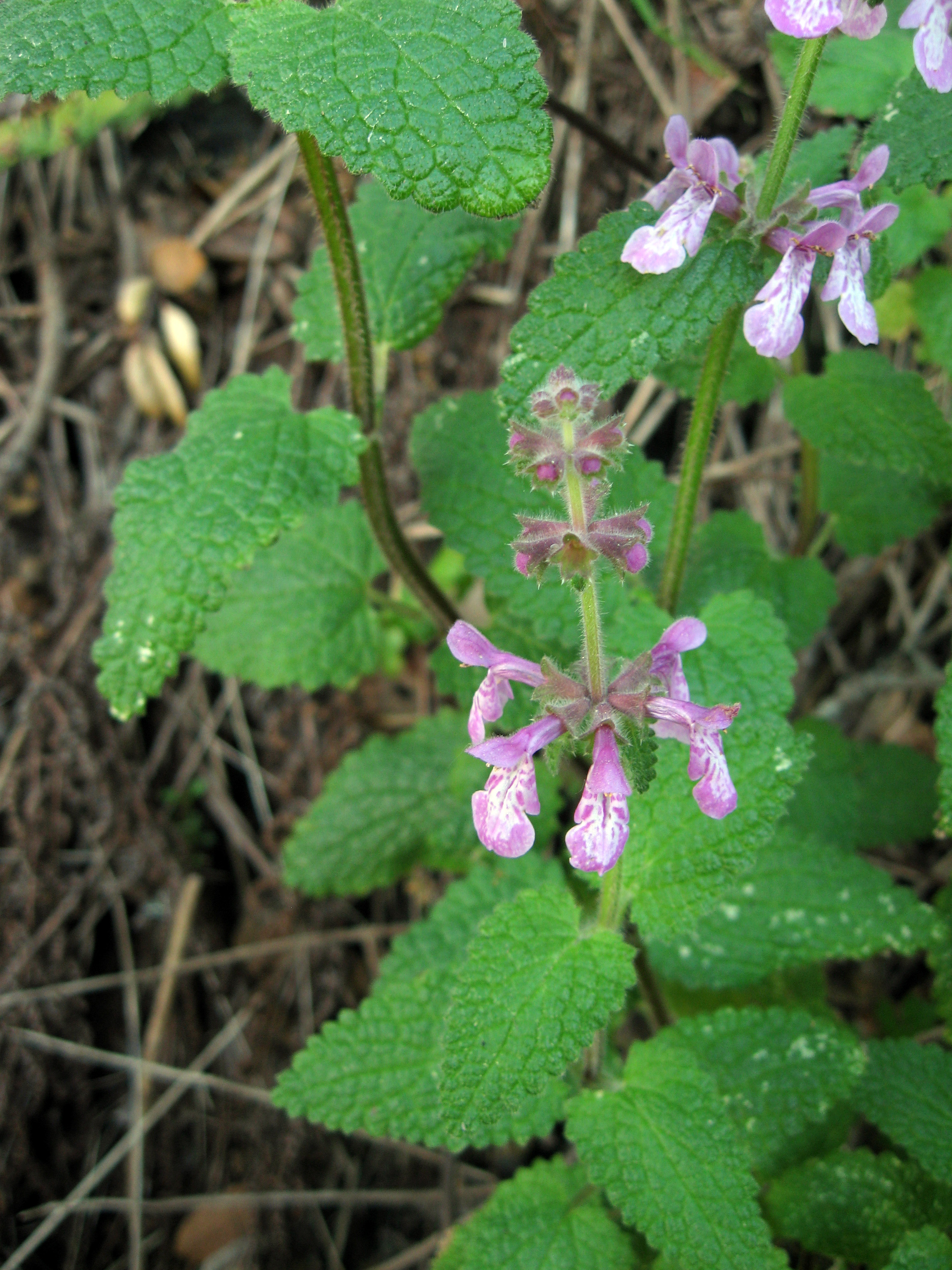

Scientific classification
- Kingdom: Plantae
- Clade: Tracheophytes
- Clade: Angiosperms
- Clade: Eudicots
- Clade: Asterids
- Order: Lamiales
- Family: Lamiaceae
- Genus: Stachys
- Species: S. bullata

Binomial name
- Stachys bullata Benth.

= Stachys bullata =

Species of flowering plant

Stachys bullata is a perennial herb and belongs to the mint family and is known by the common name California hedgenettle. Stachys bullata is native to California and is characterized by its aroma, long stems, and tubular purple flowers. Stachys bullata serves an important ethnobotanic role in California, as a plant used by pollinators as well as for its uses in traditional indigenous medicinal practices.

== Distribution ==
Stachys bullata is endemic to California, where it is known to grow in the Central Coast Ranges, the Transverse Ranges, and other coastal mountain ranges in the central and southern parts of the state. Stachys bullata is typically found on dry coastal slopes with elevations under 500m. Stachys bullata can also be found in maritime coastal habitats, such as the canyons of the Channel Islands.

== Description ==
Stachys bullata produces an erect stem ranging from 40 to 80 centimeters tall. It is coated in rough and soft hairs, some glandular. The hairy, glandular leaves range from 3 to 18 centimeters long, borne in opposite pairs along the stem. The hairy, glandular inflorescence is made up of interrupted clusters of six flowers each. The flower has a tubular pink corolla up to a centimeter long borne in a hairy calyx of sepals. The calyx tube measures from 6 to 7.5mm, while the corolla tube is 7 to 10mm long. The active flowering period of Stachys bullata is from March to September.

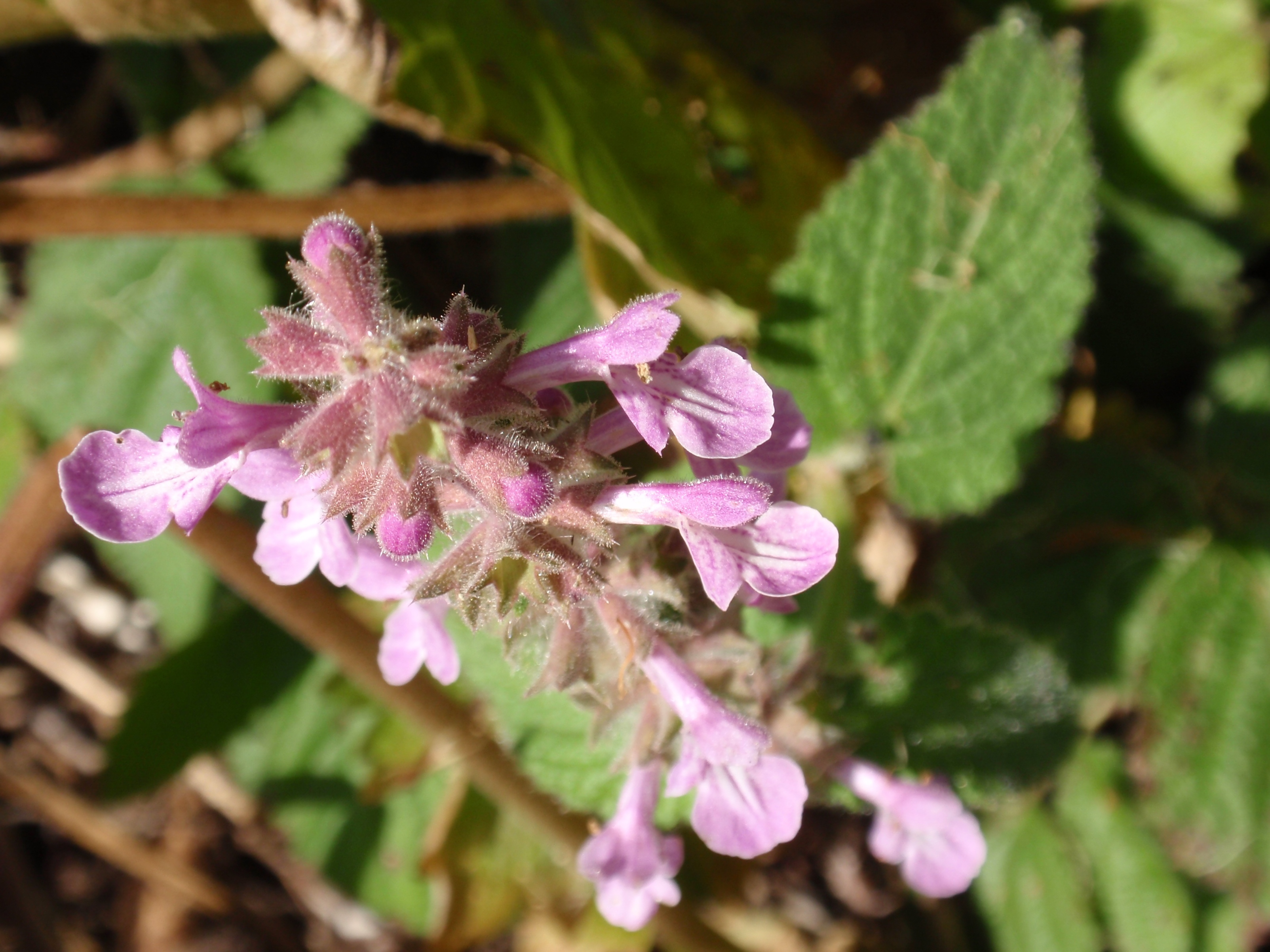
Stachys bullata, flower detail

== Uses and Ecology ==
Stachys bullata has a documented and rich history in California Ethnobotany. Indigenous groups such as the Ohlone used the plant medicinally, using leaf poultices as a topical ointment. Stachys bullata is also an important plant ecologically, as the tubular flowers are a nectar source for pollinators.
