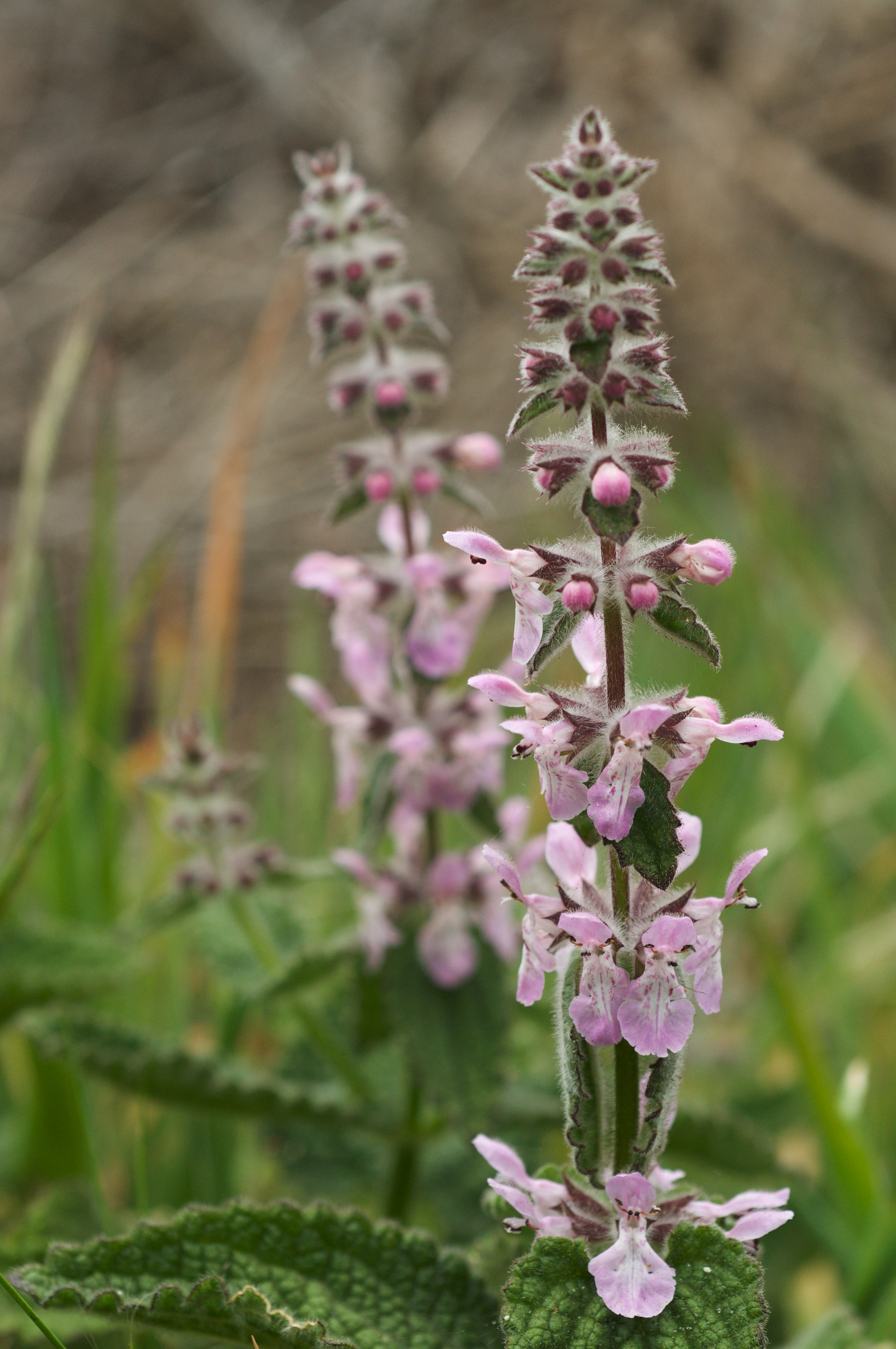

Conservation status
- Apparently Secure (NatureServe)

Scientific classification
- Kingdom: Plantae
- Clade: Tracheophytes
- Clade: Angiosperms
- Clade: Eudicots
- Clade: Asterids
- Order: Lamiales
- Family: Lamiaceae
- Genus: Stachys
- Species: S. ajugoides

Binomial name
- Stachys ajugoides Benth.

= Stachys ajugoides =

Bugle hedgenettle

Species of flowering plant

Stachys ajugoides is a species of flowering plant in the mint family known by the common name bugle hedgenettle. It is native to western North America, where it can be found in many types of habitat in Oregon, California, and Baja California, especially moist areas. It is an aromatic herb with serrate leaves. The inflorescence is a spike of interrupted clusters of flowers, often in shades of pink.
