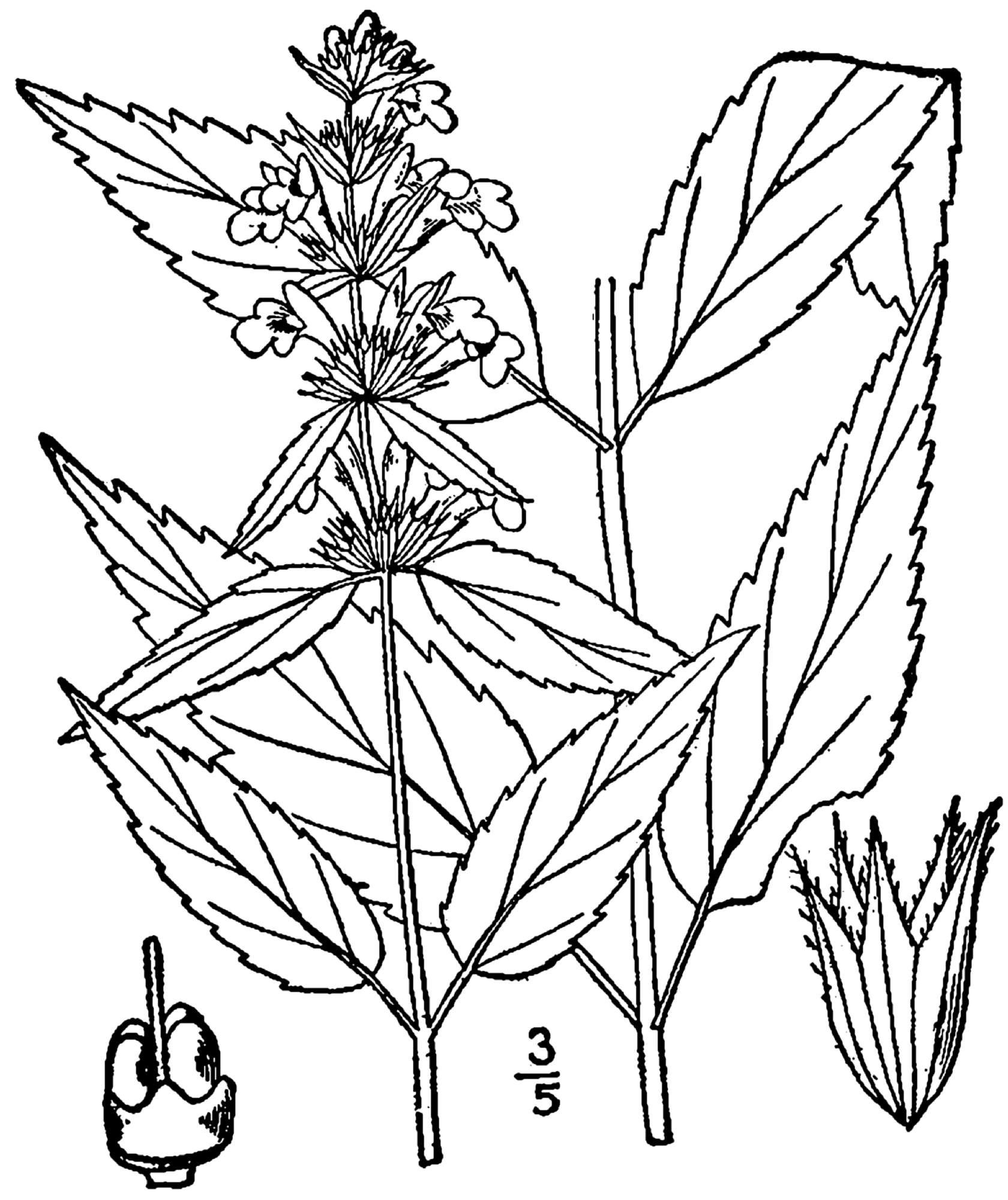

Scientific classification
- Kingdom: Plantae
- Clade: Tracheophytes
- Clade: Angiosperms
- Clade: Eudicots
- Clade: Asterids
- Order: Lamiales
- Family: Lamiaceae
- Genus: Stachys
- Species: S. tenuifolia

Binomial name
- Stachys tenuifolia Willd.

= Stachys tenuifolia =

Species of flowering plant

Stachys tenuifolia, the smooth hedgenettle, is a herbaceous perennial plant in the family Lamiaceae.

== Distribution ==
The distribution of Stachys tenuifolia is Eastern Canada, to central and Eastern USA. It is a wetland indicator species. Being found in wooded brownwater river bottoms and edges.

== Description ==
Identifying features for this species are a root system consisting of a taproot and rhizomes, and can spread to form vegetative colonies. It is Pollinated primarily by long tongue bees producing 4 black nutlets and visited by short tongue bees, white flower flies feeding on its pollen. Due to the bitter foliage it is not often eaten by mammalian herbivores.
