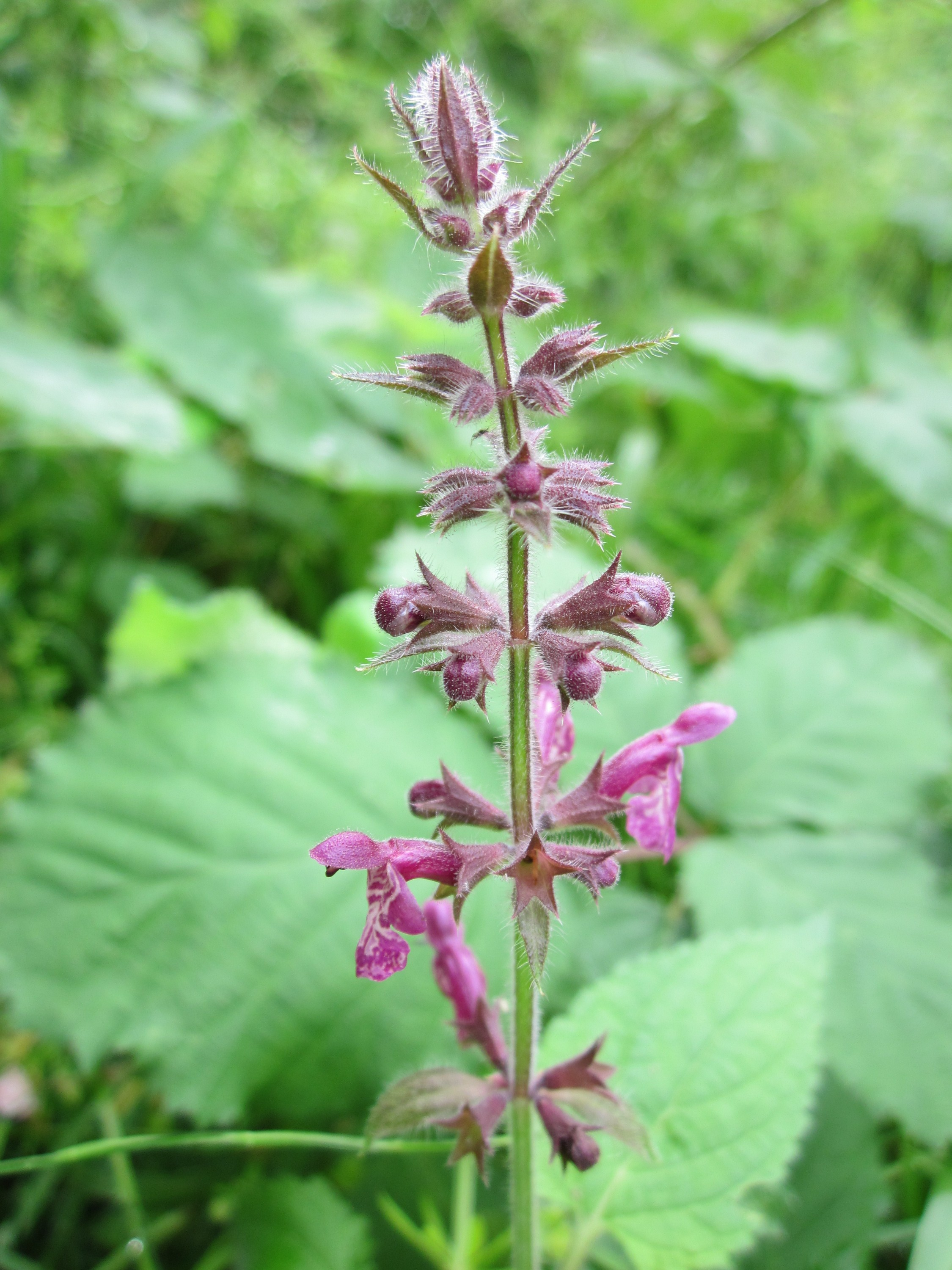
- Stachys sylvatica

Scientific classification
- Kingdom: Plantae
- Clade: Tracheophytes
- Clade: Angiosperms
- Clade: Eudicots
- Clade: Asterids
- Order: Lamiales
- Family: Lamiaceae
- Subfamily: Lamioideae
- Genus: Stachys; L.

Type species
- Stachys sylvatica L.

Species
- About 360; see text

Synonyms
- List: Aspasia E.Mey. ex Pfeiff.; Bonamya Neck.; Chamaesphacos Schrenk ex Fisch. & C.A.Mey.; Eriostemum Steud; Eriostomum Hoffmanns. & Link; Galeopsis Hill 1756 not L. 1753 nor Adans. 1763 nor Moench 1794; Galeopsis Moench 1794 not L. 1753 nor Adans. 1763 nor Moench 1794 nor Hill 1756; Koevia Krestovsk.; Lamiostachys Krestovsk.; Menitskia (Krestovsk.) Krestovsk.; Olisia Spach; Ortostachys Fourr.; Stachyus St.-Lag.; Tapeinanthus Boiss. ex Hohen.; Tetrahitum Hoffmanns. & Link; Thuspeinanta T.Durand; Trixago Haller; Trixella Fourr.; Zietenia Gled.

= Stachys =

Genus of plants in the sage family

Stachys is a genus of plants, one of the largest in the mint family Lamiaceae. Estimates of the number of species vary from about 300 to about 450. Plants of the World Online accepts 373 species. Stachys is in the subfamily Lamioideae and its type species is Stachys sylvatica. The precise extent of the genus and its relationship to other genera in the subfamily are poorly known.

== Range and naming ==
The distribution of the genus covers Europe, Asia, Africa, Australasia and North America. Common names include hedgenettle, heal-all, self-heal, woundwort, betony, Monty plant and lamb's ears.

Stachys was named by Linnaeus in Species Plantarum in 1753. The name is derived from the Greek word σταχυς (stachys), meaning "an ear of grain", and refers to the fact that the inflorescence is often a spike. The name woundwort derives from the past use of certain species in herbal medicine for the treatment of wounds.

== Human uses ==
The Chinese artichoke or Crosne (S. affinis), is grown for its edible tuber. Several species are cultivated as ornamentals. Woolly betony (S. byzantina) is a popular decorative garden plant. Wood betony (S. officinalis) was historically a highly valued medicinal plant.

== Use by other species ==
Stachys species are used as food plants by the larvae of some Lepidoptera species, including the moths Coleophora auricella, C. lineolea, and C. wockeella, all recorded on S. officinalis. They are also widely used by the European wool carder bee (Anthidium manicatum), which scrape the hairs from the plant in order to use them for building their nests.

== Description ==
Stachys is a genus of shrubs and annual or perennial herbs. The stems vary from 50–300 cm (20–120 in) tall, with simple, opposite, triangular leaves, 1–14 cm (0.4–5.5 in) long with serrate margins. In most species, the leaves are softly hairy. The flowers are 1 to 2 cm (0.4 to 0.8 in) long, clustered in the axils of the leaves on the upper part of the stem. The corolla is 5-lobed with the top lobe forming a 'hood', varying from white to pink, purple, red or pale yellow.

== Circumscription ==
The distinction between Stachys and other genera is unclear and has varied from one author to another. In 2002, a molecular phylogenetic study showed that Stachys officinalis is not closely related to the rest of the genus. This study also found six other genera to be embedded within Stachys as it is currently circumscribed. The embedded genera are Prasium, Phlomidoschema, Sideritis, Haplostachys, Phyllostegia, and Stenogyne.

== Fossil record ==
†Stachys pliocenica fossil seeds are known from Upper Miocene strata of Bulgaria and Pliocene strata of south-eastern Belarus. The fossil seeds are similar to the seeds of Stachys cretica.

== Diversity ==
Plants of the World Online accepts 373 species. Selected species include:

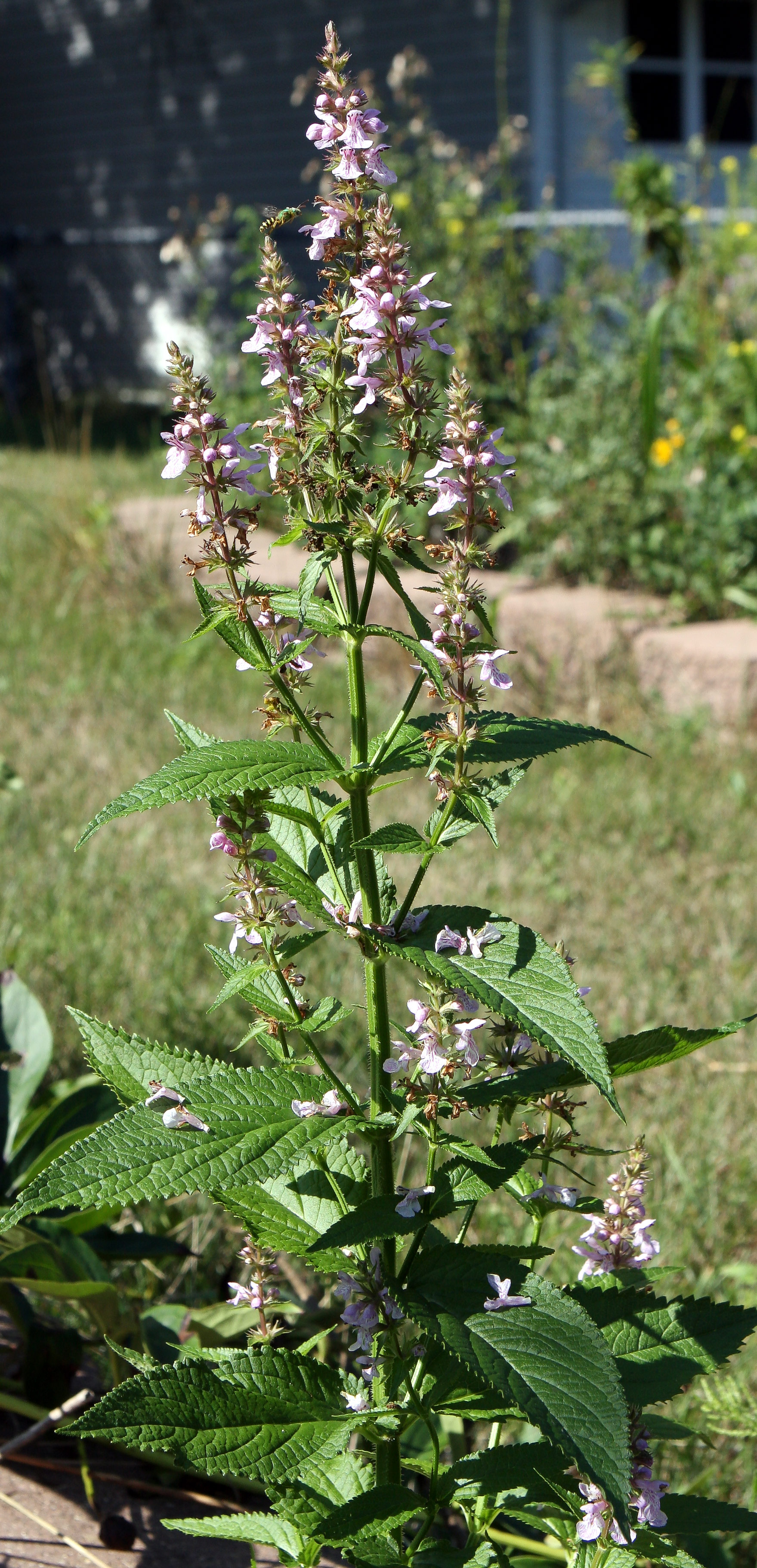
Stachys tenuifolia var. hispida

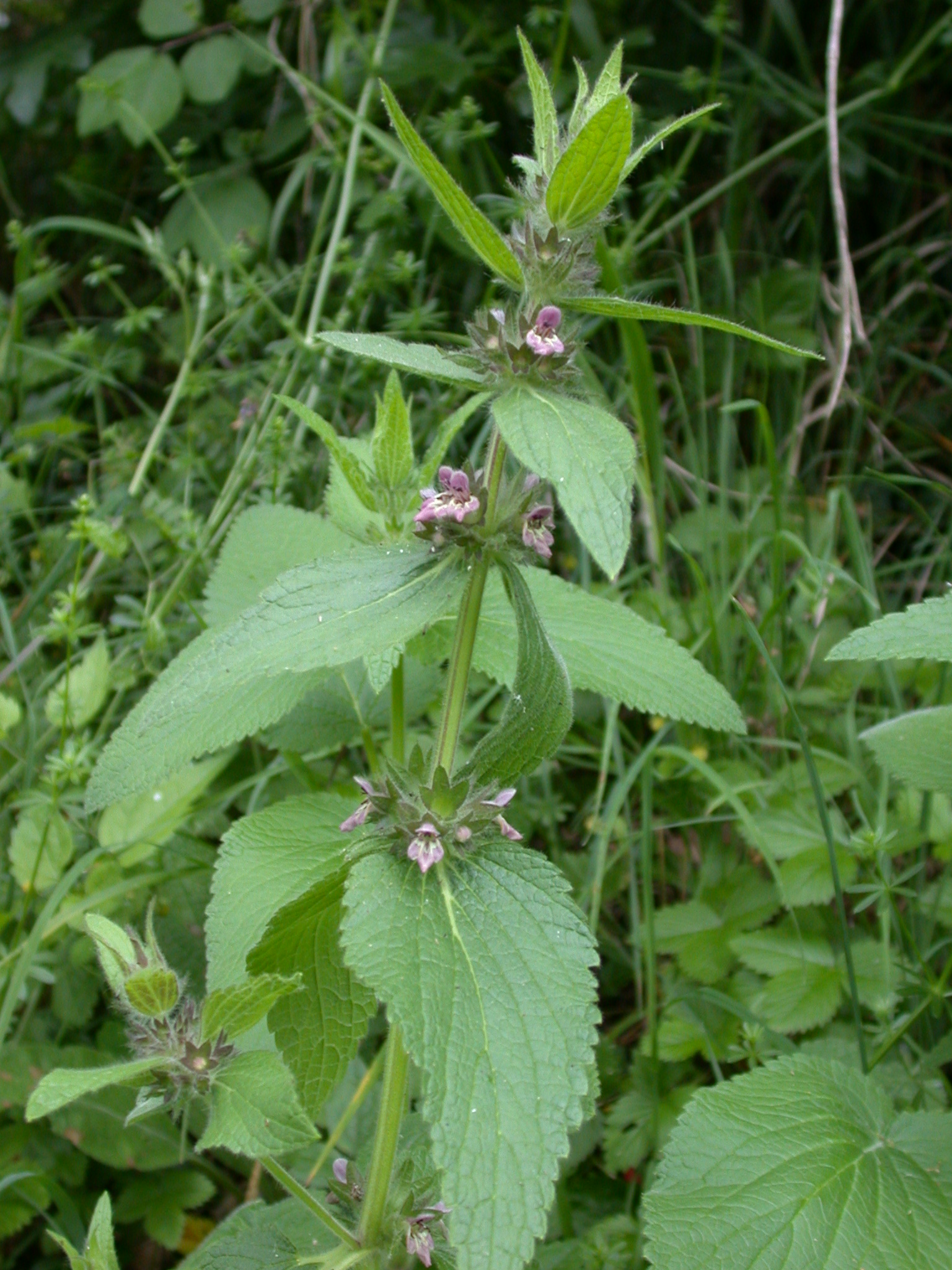
Stachys alpina

- Stachys affinis Bunge – Chinese artichoke
- Stachys ajugoides Benth. – bugle hedgenettle
- Stachys alabamica B.R.Keener & L.J.Davenp. – Alabama hedgenettle
- Stachys albens A.Gray – white hedgenettle, whitestem hedgenettle
- Stachys albicaulis Lindl.
- Stachys alpina L. – alpine woundwort
- Stachys annua (L.) L. – annual woundwort
- Stachys arvensis L. – staggerweed, field woundwort

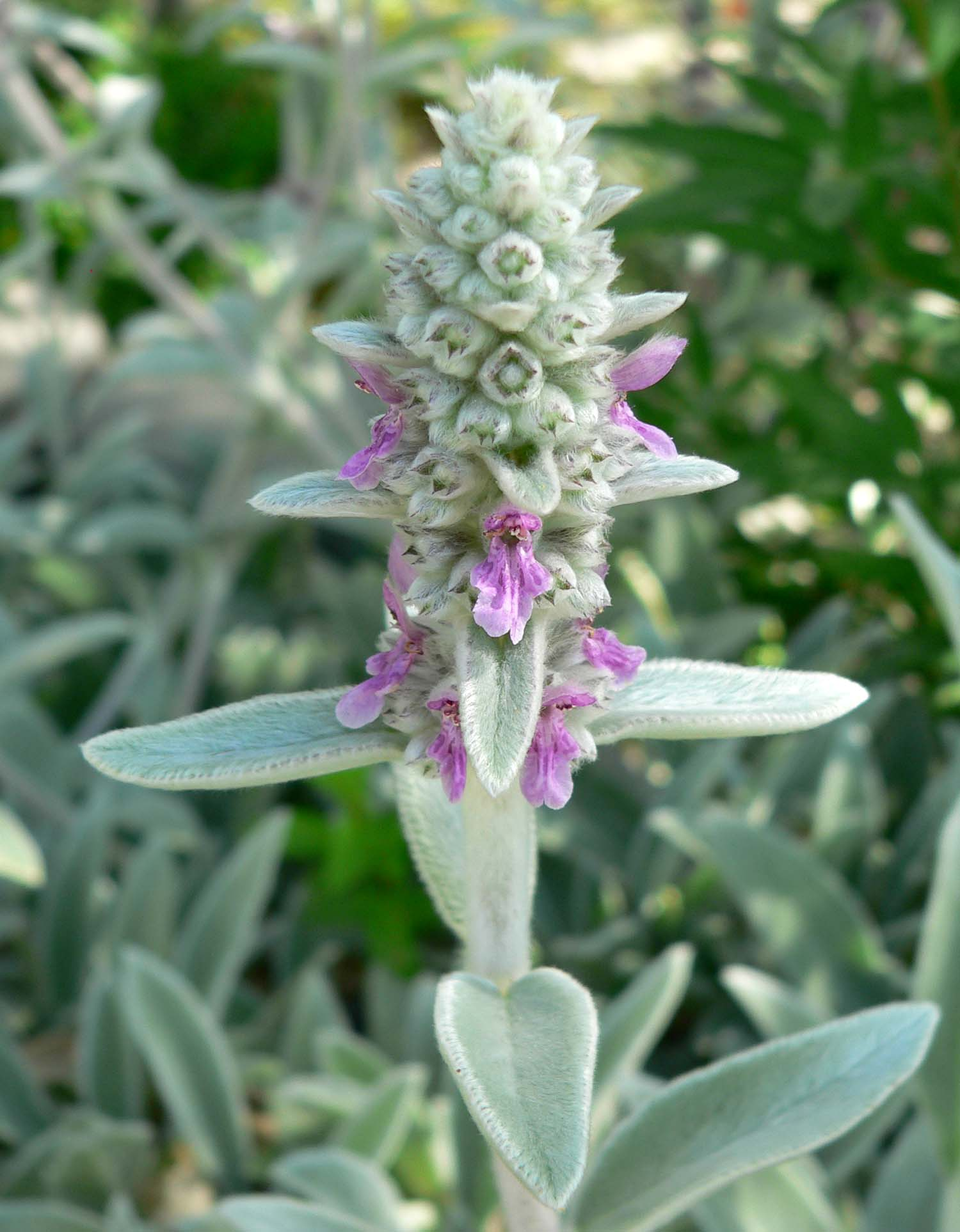
Stachys byzantina

- Stachys bullata Benth.
- Stachys byzantina K.Koch – woolly betony, lamb's ear
- Stachys candida Bory & Chaub.
- Stachys chamissonis Benth. – great hedge nettle, coastal hedge nettle
- Stachys chamissonis var. cooleyae (A.Heller) G.A.Mulligan & D.B.Munro – Cooley's hedge nettle
- Stachys chrysantha Boiss. & Heldr.
- Stachys citrina Benth.
- Stachys clingmanii Small – Clingman's hedge nettle
- Stachys coccinea Ortega

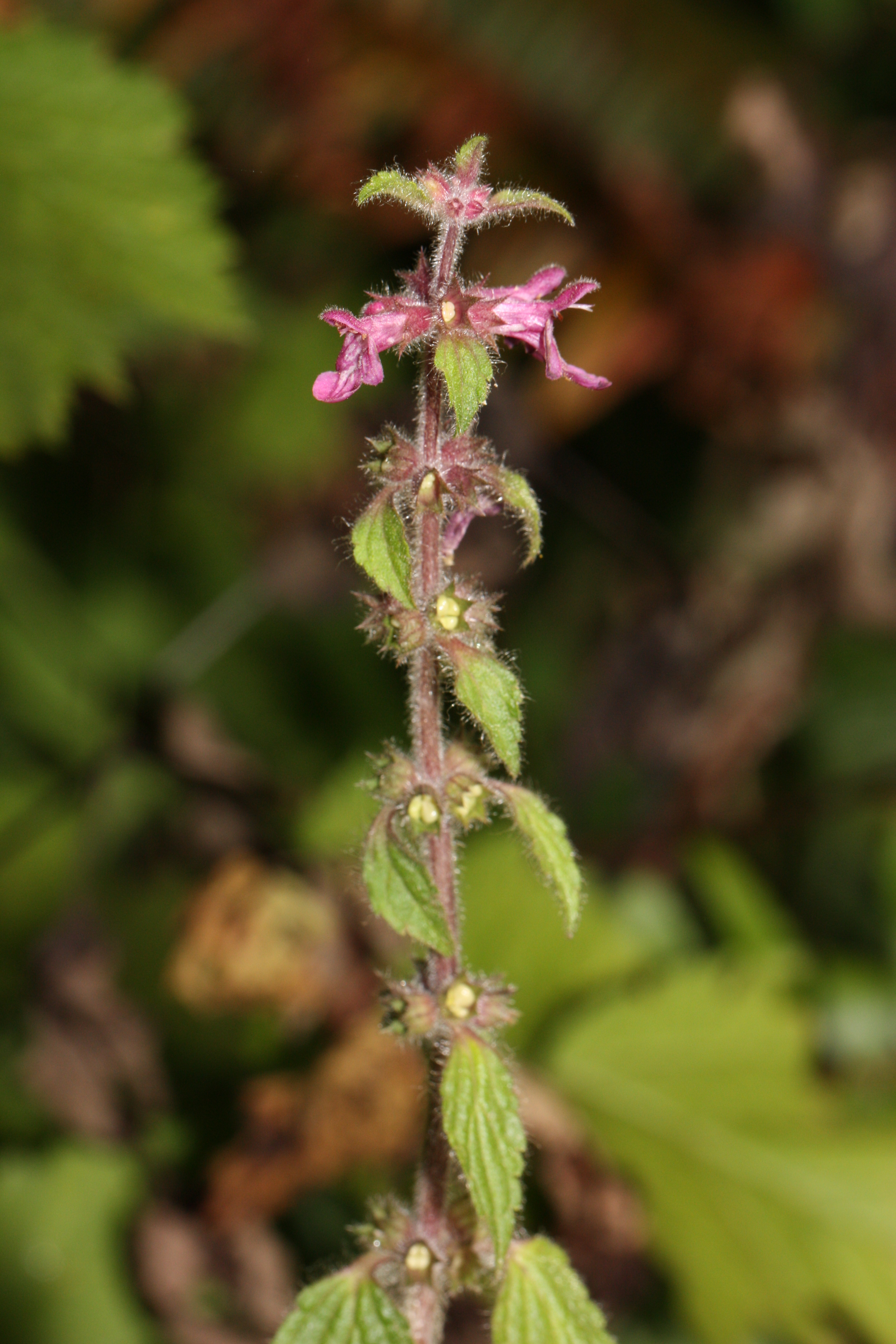
Stachys chamissonis var. cooleyae

- Stachys corsica Pers.
- Stachys cretica L.
- Stachys debilis Kunth
- Stachys ehrenbergii Boiss.
- Stachys floridana Benth. – Florida hedgenettle, Florida betony
- Stachys germanica L. – downy woundwort
- Stachys glutinosa L.
- Stachys hispida Pursh – rough hedge-nettle
- Stachys hyssopifolia Michx.
- Stachys iva Griseb.
- Stachys lavandulifolia Vahl
- Stachys libanotica Benth.
- Stachys manantlanensis B.L.Turner
- Stachys mexicana Benth. – Mexican hedge nettle
- Stachys milanii Magnier

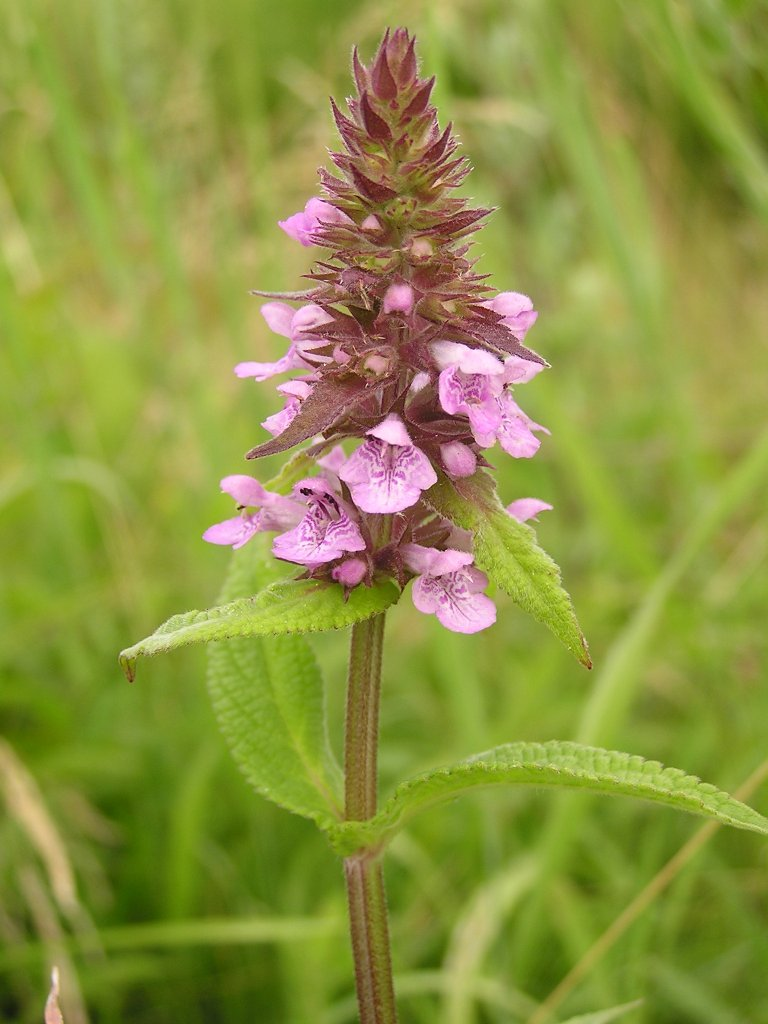
Stachys palustris

- Stachys nelsonii B.R.Keener & L.J.Davenp. – Nelson's hedgenettle
- Stachys palustris L. – marsh woundwort, marsh hedge-nettle
- Stachys pumila Banks & Sol.
- Stachys pycnantha Benth.
- Stachys recta L. – yellow woundwort
- Stachys riederi Cham.
- Stachys rigida Benth. – rough hedgenettle

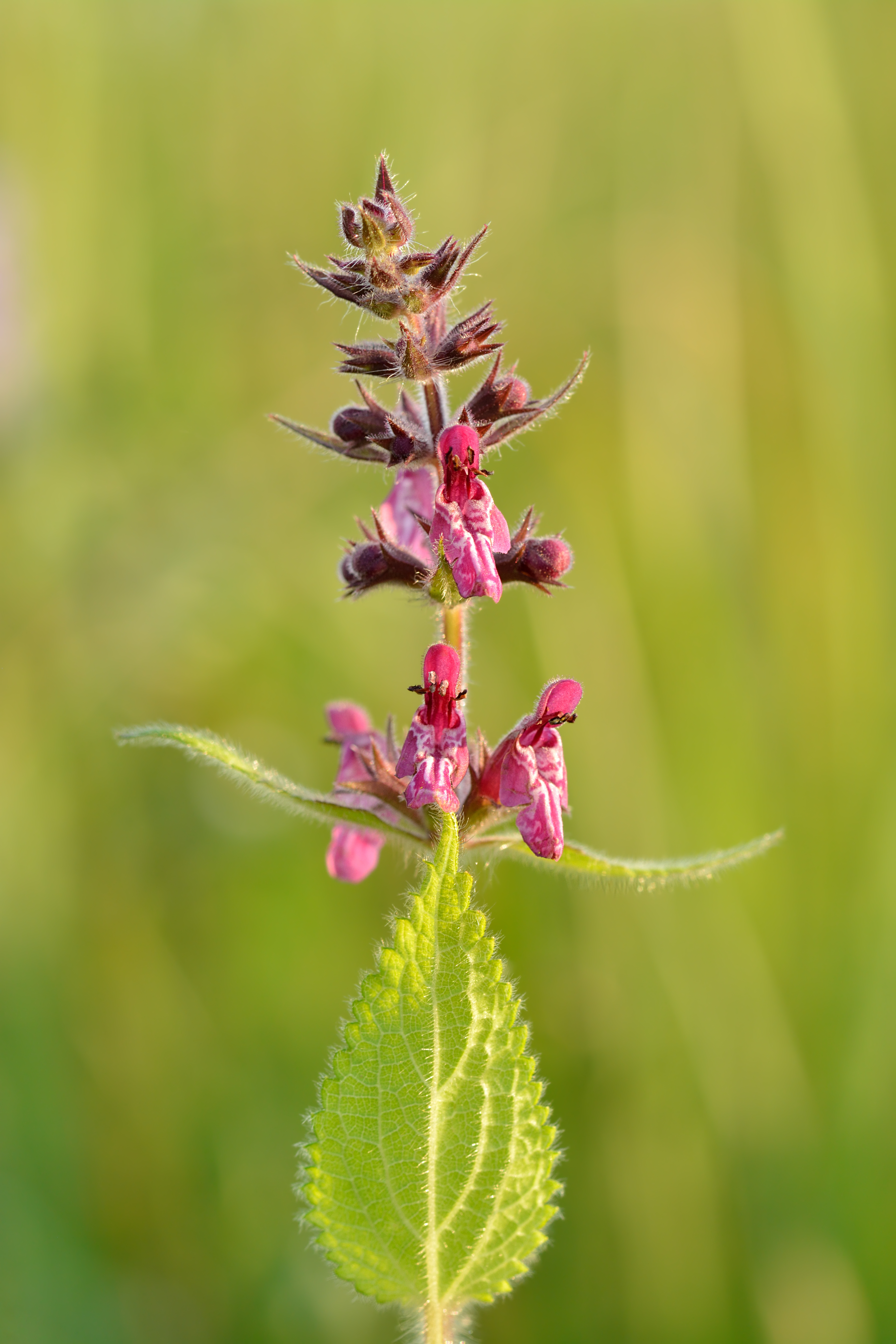
Stachys sylvatica

- Stachys sprucei Briq.
- Stachys stricta Greene
- Stachys sylvatica L. – hedge woundwort
- Stachys tenuifolia Willd. – smooth hedgenettle

=== Formerly placed here ===
- Agastache foeniculum (Pursh) Kuntze (as S. foeniculum Pursh)
- Leonurus japonicus Houtt. (as S. artemisia Lour.)
- Stachys monieri (Gouan) P.W.Ball, now in the synonymy of Betonica officinalis
- Betonica macrantha K.Koch (as S. macrantha (K.Koch) Stearn)
- Betonica officinalis L. (as S. officinalis (L.) Trevis.)
