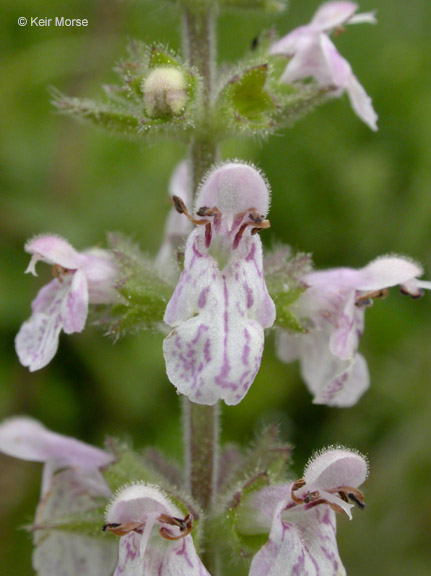

Scientific classification
- Kingdom: Plantae
- Clade: Tracheophytes
- Clade: Angiosperms
- Clade: Eudicots
- Clade: Asterids
- Order: Lamiales
- Family: Lamiaceae
- Genus: Stachys
- Species: S. rigida

Binomial name
- Stachys rigida Nutt. ex Benth.

= Stachys rigida =

Rough hedgenettle

Species of herb

Stachys rigida, with the common name rough hedgenettle, is a perennial herb native to the western United States. It grows in foothills, mountains, valleys, and coasts at elevations of 14 to 2340 m. S. rigida blooms in May–July.

There are two varieties classified: Stachys rigida var. quercetorum and Stachys rigida var. rigida. Variety quercetorum is only found in California and Oregon.

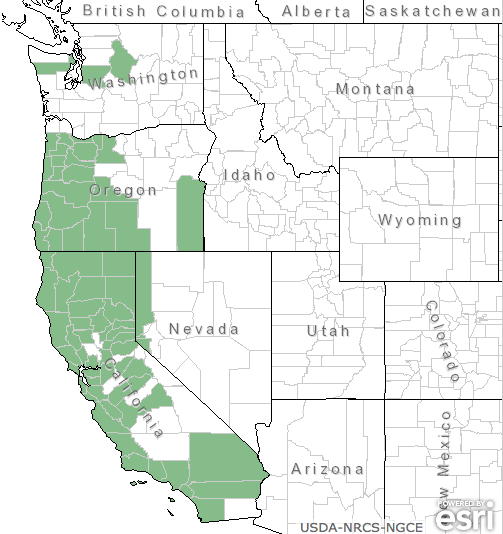
Distribution map
