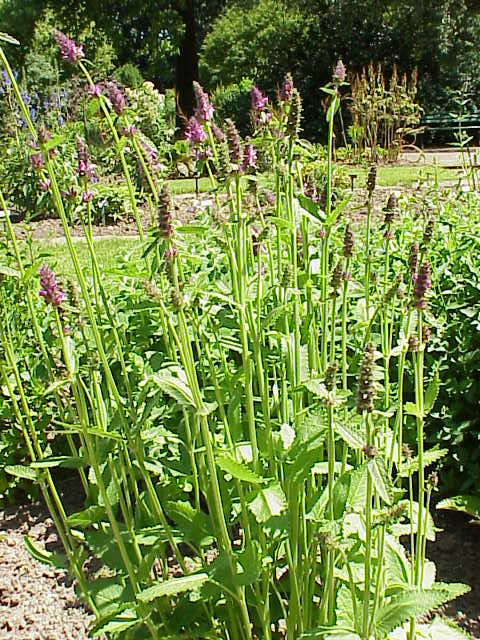

Scientific classification
- Kingdom: Plantae
- Clade: Tracheophytes
- Clade: Angiosperms
- Clade: Eudicots
- Clade: Asterids
- Order: Lamiales
- Family: Lamiaceae
- Genus: Stachys
- Species: S. affinis

Binomial name
- Stachys affinis Bunge

Synonyms
- Stachys sieboldii Miq.; Stachys tuberifera Naudin

= Stachys affinis =

Species of flowering plant

Stachys affinis is a species of woundwort, a perennial herbaceous plant of the mint and sage family Lamiaceae originating in China. It is commonly called crosne (from French pronounced [kʁon]), knotroot, Chinese artichoke, Japanese artichoke, or artichoke betony. Its rhizome is a root vegetable that can be eaten raw, pickled or cooked.

== Description ==
S. affinis is a perennial herbaceous plant with red to purple flowers and reaches a height of 30–120 centimetres (12–47 in). The green leaves are opposite arranged on the stem. The rough, nettle-like leaves can be ovate-cordate shaped with a width of 2.5–9.5 cm (1–3 3/4 in) or ovate-oblong with a width of 1.5–3.5 cm (5/8–1 3/8 in). The leaves are separated into a leaf blade and a petiole. The petiole has a length of 1–2 cm (3/8–3/4 in) and becomes shorter towards the stem apex.

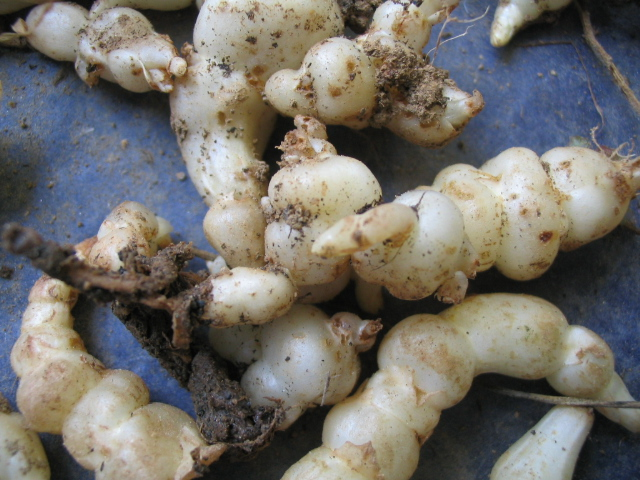
Tubers of S. affinis

Similar to the potato, S. affinis grows rhizomes which are approximately 8 cm (3 1/8 in) long and 2 cm (3/4 in) thick. By medullary primary growth they thicken primarily on the internodes and less on the nodes. This way at irregular intervals constricted tubers are formed, which are usually thinner on both ends. The tubers are covered with a thin, pale-beige-to-ivory skin, these appearing features altogether reminded Chinese farmers of silkworm pupae, thus they call this plant 地蠶 dìcán "ground silkworm" or 土蛹 tǔyǒng "ground pupa". The flesh underneath is white and tender. It yields a sweet flavour, hence another common Chinese name of 甘露子 gānlùzi "sweet dewlet" after 甘露 gānlù "sweet dew".

=== Compounds ===
Vacuoles in the tuber of S. affinis are rich in stachyose. Stachyose is a tetrasaccharide, consisting of galactose, glucose and fructose. Stachyose is evaluated to be about 230 mg/kg in dry tubers.

== Origin and history ==
S. affinis originates from central and northern China. It had been cultivated in China by the 13th century; often in wheat fields to be harvested after a four-month cycle, or foraged in the wilderness.

Before S. affinis was introduced to Europe, a related crop named S. palustris was collected in nature to be consumed as a vegetable. Later on, Germanic peoples used S. recta, another relative of S. affinis, as a medicinal plant. The plant was then cultivated from the 18th century onwards. In 1882 the crop was cultivated on a farm for the first time in Crosne. S. affinis is the only labiate which is cultivated as vegetable in Europe. At the beginning of the 20th century S. affinis became more and more popular until it was abandoned again in the 1970s due to problems with viruses and the plant's strong vagility (tendency to spread). Since 1990 there has been a rise in the cultivation of S. affinis with availability in some markets and grocery stores. The plant is listed in the "Handbook of Alien Species in Europe" as an invasive plant in Europe.

== Taxonomy ==
The plant is part of the family Lamiaceae. A later described species, named S. sieboldii, in dedication to the German-Dutch botanist and japanologist Philipp Franz von Siebold, is considered to be a synonym.

== Cultivation ==
S. affinis is planted as a bulb (vegetative) in spring (March–May). Multiple bulbs are planted 5 to 8 cm (2 to 3 1/8 in) deep into a hole of dimensions 30 by 30 cm (12 by 12 in). The plant can achieve a height of 30 cm (12 in). Weeding is necessary but it is important not to damage the root system. A sufficient water supply during summer is important.

Harvest is from November to March. It is important that the soil is not frozen when harvesting.

The storage of S. affinis tubers is difficult. Because of their thin skin, they can be stored only for a few days, about a week in a fridge. An alternative can be a fresh ongoing harvesting out of humid sand, thereby the tubers stay fresh for several months.

== Usage ==
=== Culinary ===
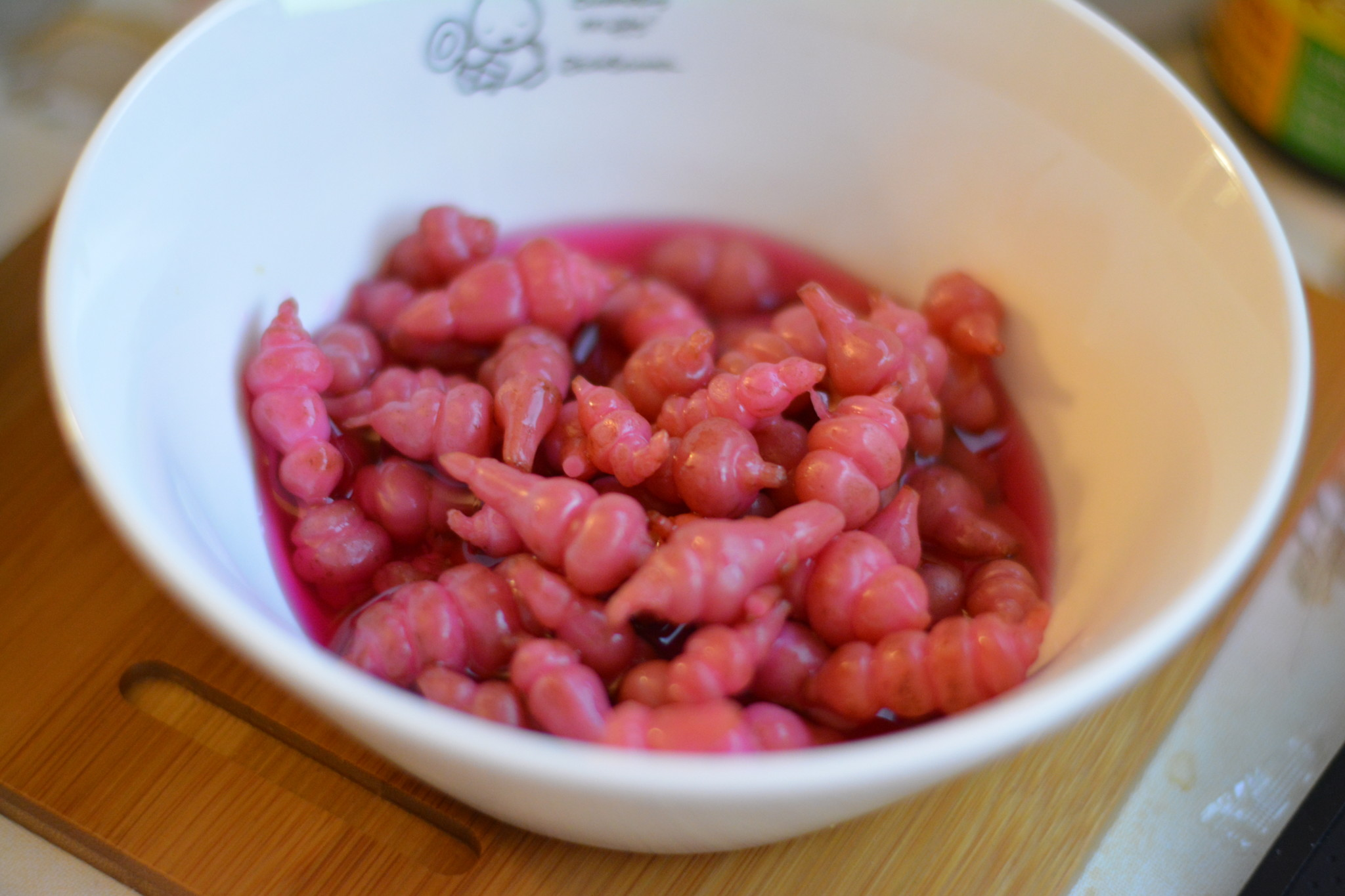
Pickled, dyed chorogi in Japan

The tubers have a crunchy texture and a sweet, nutty flavour. They can be eaten raw, pickled, dried or cooked. A wide range of uses for this vegetable leads to various dishes in the cuisine of many countries. They can be prepared similarly to Jerusalem artichokes. The leaves can be dried and made into a tea.

In Chinese and Japanese cuisine, S. affinis is primarily pickled. In particular, its tuber is a part of Osechi, cooked for celebrating Japanese New Year. Dyed red by leaves of Perilla (red shiso) after being pickled, it is called chorogi. In Korea it is called choseokjam (초석잠). In China, it is preserved in radish sauce, vegetable pickle brine or soy sauce.

In French cuisine, its cooked tuber is often served alongside dishes named japonaise or Japanese-styled.

=== Medicinal ===
In traditional Chinese medicine, the entirety of S. affinis is used as an agent to treat colds and pneumonia. The root, kown separately as 根 gēn, is often prescribed soaked wholely or pounded in wine before consumed to eliminate "wind".

In addition, root extract of S. affinis has shown antimicrobial activity. Furthermore, Baek et al. observed antioxidant activity in 2004. Also in 2004 inhibitory effects on acetylcholine esterase, monoamine oxidase and xanthine oxidase activities were observed in rat brains after 20 days of feeding with methanolic extracts of S. affinis. Ethanol extract from this plant also seems to have antitumour activity.
