= Syncopacma linella =

Scientific classification
- Domain: Eukaryota
- Kingdom: Animalia
- Phylum: Arthropoda
- Class: Insecta
- Order: Lepidoptera
- Family: Gelechiidae
- Genus: Syncopacma
- Species: S. linella

Binomial name
- Syncopacma linella (Chrétien, 1904)

Synonyms
- Anacampsis linella Chrétien, 1904; Aproaerema linellum; Lixodessa schoenmanni Gozmány, 1957

Species of moth

Syncopacma linella is a moth of the family Gelechiidae. It was described by Pierre Chrétien in 1904. It is found in France, Austria, Slovakia, Hungary, Romania and Ukraine.

The wingspan is about 12 mm.

The larvae feed on Linum campanulatum and Linum narbonense. The mines have the form of large full-depth fleck mines.
