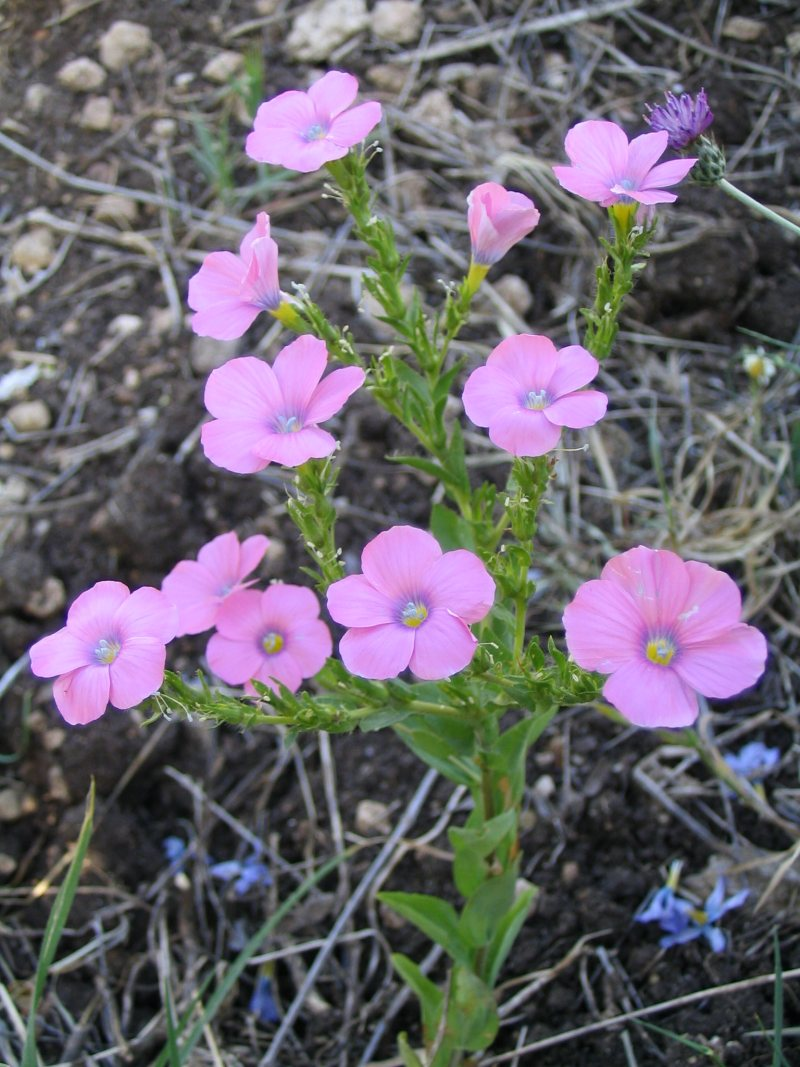
- Linum pubescens

Scientific classification
- Kingdom: Plantae
- Clade: Tracheophytes
- Clade: Angiosperms
- Clade: Eudicots
- Clade: Rosids
- Order: Malpighiales
- Family: Linaceae
- Subfamily: Linoideae
- Genus: Linum; L.

Species
- about 200, see text

= Linum =

Genus of flowering plants

Linum (flax) is a genus of approximately 200 species in the flowering plant family Linaceae. They are native to temperate and subtropical regions of the world. The genus includes the common flax (L. usitatissimum), the bast fibre of which is used to produce linen and the seeds to produce linseed oil.

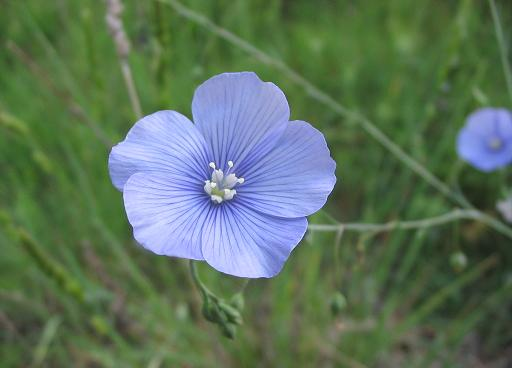
Linum narbonense

The flowers of most species are blue or yellow, rarely red, white, or pink, and some are heterostylous. There is an average of 6 to 10 seeds per boll.

Linum species are used as food plants by the larvae of some Lepidoptera species including the cabbage moth, the nutmeg, the setaceous Hebrew character and Coleophora striolatella, which feeds exclusively on Linum narbonense.

== Cultivation ==
Several flaxes are cultivated as garden ornamentals, including the blue-flowered species blue flax (L. narbonense), Lewis' blue flax (L. lewisii), and perennial blue flax (L. perenne), the red-flowered scarlet flax (L. grandiflorum), and the yellow-flowered golden flax (L. flavum). In Eurasia, since Roman times, the genus Linum has been cultivated not only for its plant fiber, but also its seeds and tender leaves for culinary usage.

== Selected species ==
- Linum africanum
- Linum alatum – winged flax
- Linum album
- Linum alpinum
- Linum arboreum – tree flax
- Linum arenicola – sand flax
- Linum aristatum – bristle flax
- Linum australe – southern flax
- Linum austriacum – Asian flax
- Linum berlandieri – Berlandier's yellow flax
- Linum bienne (syn. L. angustifolium) – pale flax
- Linum campanulatum
- Linum cariense
- Linum carteri – Carter's flax
- Linum catharticum – fairy flax
- Linum compactum – Wyoming flax
- Linum cratericola – Galápagos Islands flax
- Linum dolomiticum – Dolomite Flax
- Linum elongatum – Laredo flax
- Linum flavum – golden flax
- Linum floridanum – Florida yellow flax
- Linum grandiflorum – scarlet flax, flowering flax
- Linum hirsutum – downy flax
- Linum hudsonioides – Texas flax
- Linum imbricatum – tufted flax
- Linum intercursum – sandplain flax
- Linum kingii – King's flax
- Linum leoni
- Linum lewisii – Lewis' blue flax, Lewis flax
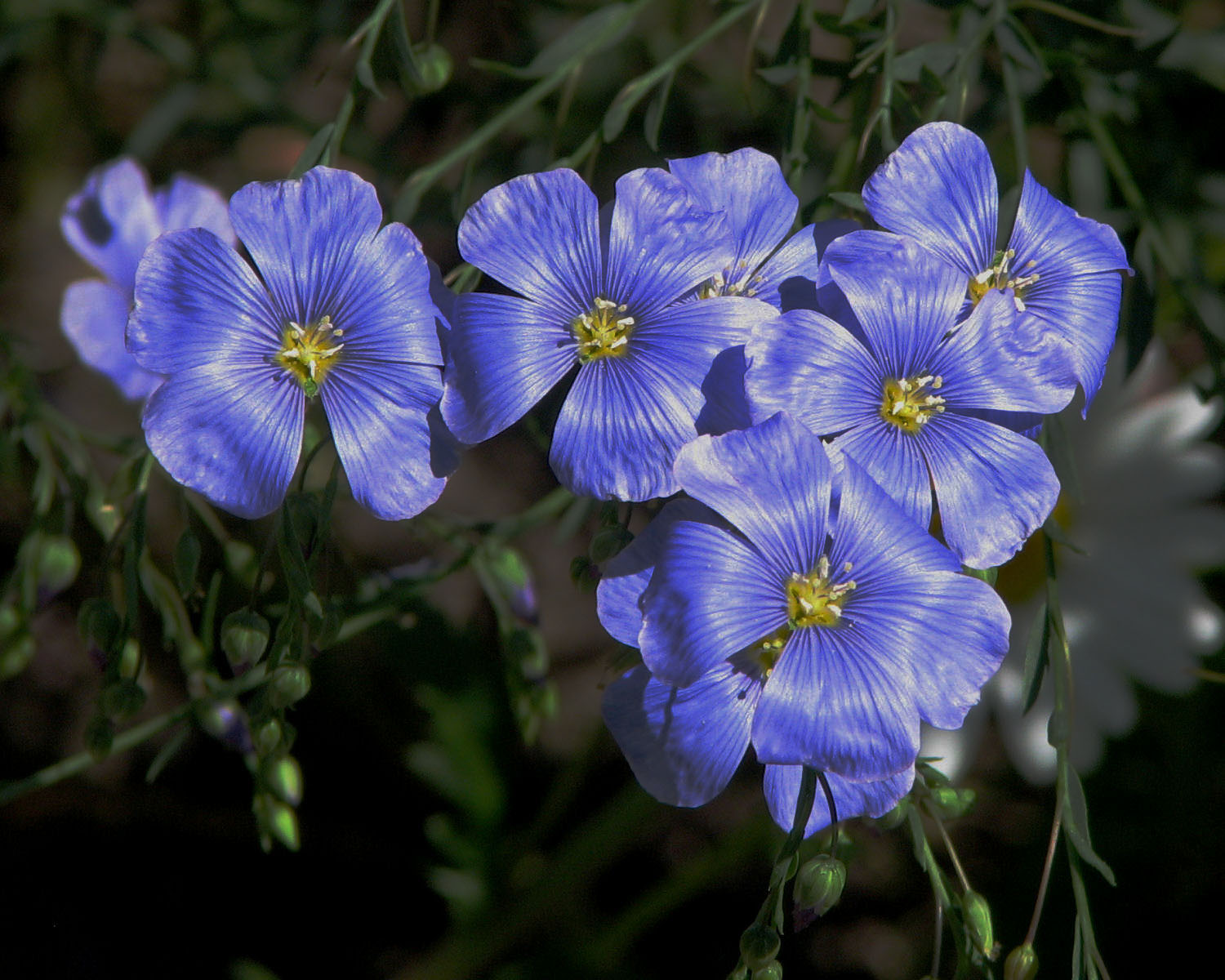
- Linum usitatissimum
  Linum lundellii – Sullivan City flax
- Linum macrocarpum – Spring Hill flax
- Linum marginale – Australian native flax
- Linum medium – stiff yellow flax
- Linum monogynum – New Zealand linen flax
- Linum narbonense – blue flax
- Linum neomexicanum – New Mexico yellow flax
- Linum perenne – perennial blue flax
- Linum pratense – meadow flax
- Linum puberulum – plains flax
- Linum pubescens
- Linum rigidum -– stiffstem flax
- Linum rupestre – rock flax
- Linum schiedeanum – Schiede's flax
- Linum strictum – ridged yellow flax
- Linum subteres – Sprucemont flax, slenderfoot flax
- Linum suffruticosum
- Linum sulcatum – grooved flax
- Linum tenuifolium
- Linum trigynum – French flax
- Linum ucranicum
- Linum usitatissimum – common cultivated flax
- Linum vernal – Chihuahuan flax
- Linum virginianum – woodland flax
- Linum westii – West's flax

== See also ==
- Hesperolinon
- Sclerolinon
