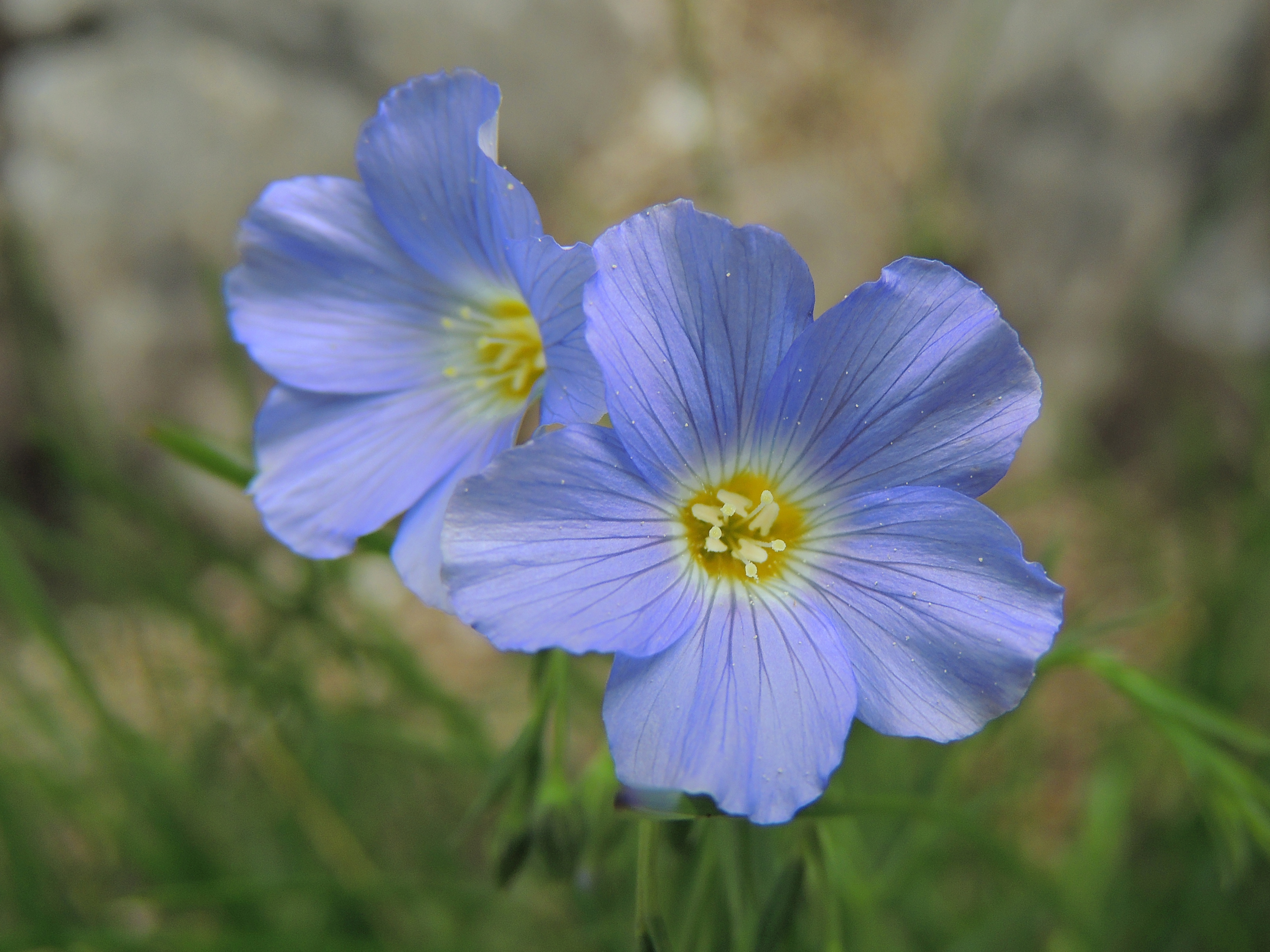
- Flowers of Linum alpinum subsp. alpinum

Scientific classification
- Kingdom: Plantae
- Clade: Tracheophytes
- Clade: Angiosperms
- Clade: Eudicots
- Clade: Rosids
- Order: Malpighiales
- Family: Linaceae
- Genus: Linum
- Species: L. alpinum

Binomial name
- Linum alpinum Jacq., 1762

Synonyms
- Adenolinum alpicola Rchb.; Adenolinum montanum Rchb.; Adenolinum pyrenaicum Rchb.

= Linum alpinum =

Alpine Flax

Species of flowering plant

Linum alpinum, the alpine flax, is a species of perennial plant belonging to the Linaceae family.

== Etymology ==
The Latin genus name Linum means thread, where as the species name alpinum means from the Alps.

== Subspecies ==
Subspecies include:

- Linum alpinum subsp. alpinum Jacq., 1762
- Linum alpinum subsp. bertolonii Guarino & Pignatti
- Linum alpinum subsp. collinum (Guss. ex Boiss.) J.-M.Tison
- Linum alpinum subsp. gracilius (Bertol.) Pignatti
- Linum alpinum subsp. julicum (Hayek) Hegi
- Linum alpinum subsp. laeve (Scop.) Nyman
- Linum alpinum subsp. pirinicum A. Petrova

== Distribution and habitat ==
This orophyte species occurs in central and southern Europe and western Asia, in rocky lawns, limestone hills and mountains of Pyrenees, Alps, Apennines, Rhodope Mountains and Urals, at an elevation of 1,400–2,500 m (4,600–8,200 ft) above sea level.

== Description ==
Linum alpinum has stems erect or recumbent, densely leafed, reaching an average of 10–50 cm (3.9–19.7 in) in height. This plant is glabrous and woody at the base. It has alternate leaves that are linear-lanceolate, up to 2.5 cm (0.98 in) long, and sessile. The hermaphrodite, rather large flowers with radial symmetry are blue, yellow at the bottom, with a diameter of 2–3 cm (0.79–1.18 in) and with erect or slightly inclined pedicels, in loose clusters each containing one to eight flowers. Sepals are unequal, with three veins at the base, 5–7 mm long. The petals are 12–20 mm long, three-four times longer than sepals. The fruits are capsules 6–8 mm long. Each fruit compartment contains a blackish seed. This species is quite similar to Linum leonii and Linum ockendonii.

== Biology ==
This perennial plant blooms from May to August. The flowers are bent before flowering, where as floral peduncles remain erect after flowering. Typical pollinators are insects (bees, bumblebees, wasps, hoverflies, etc.).

== Gallery ==
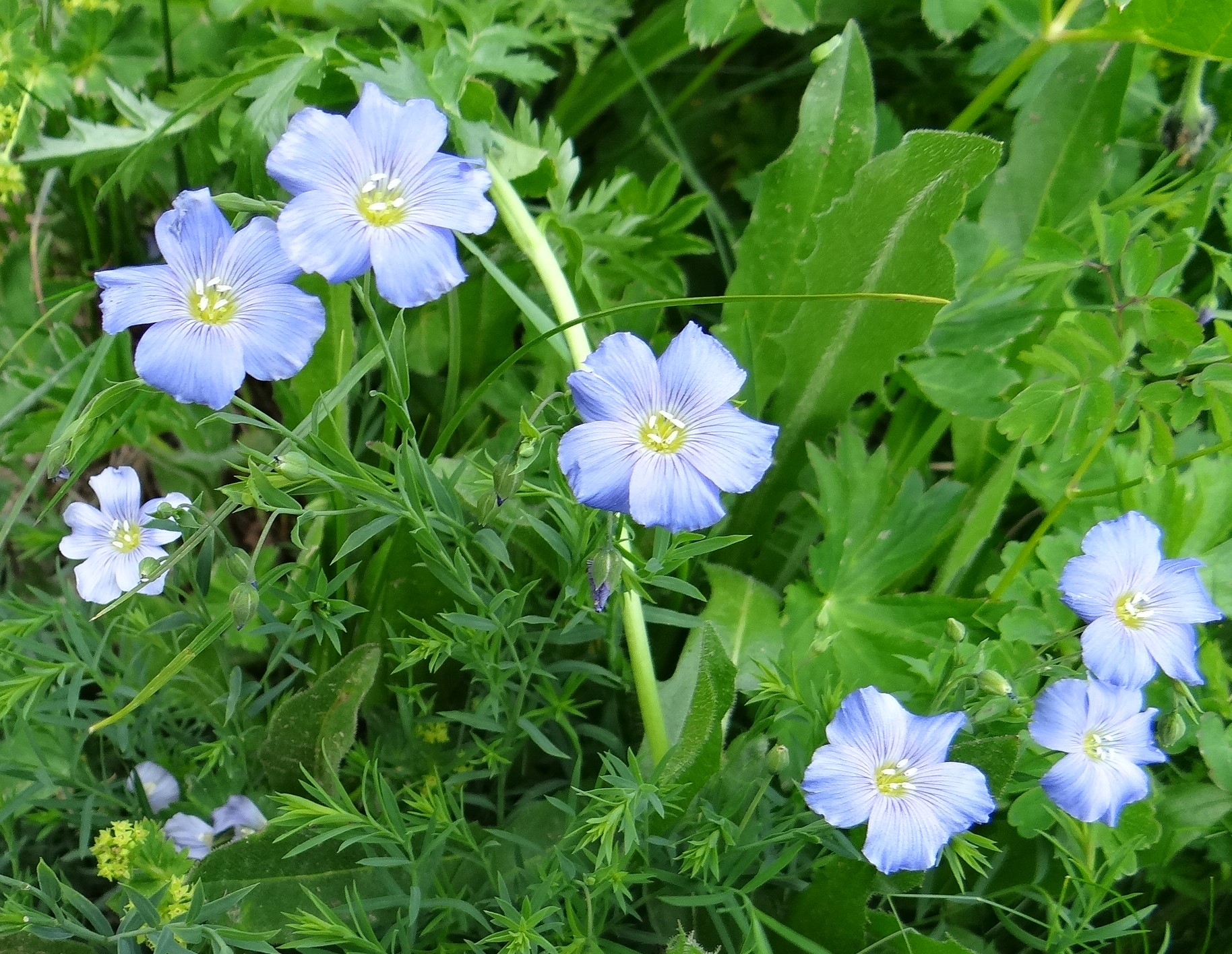
Plant of Linum alpinum

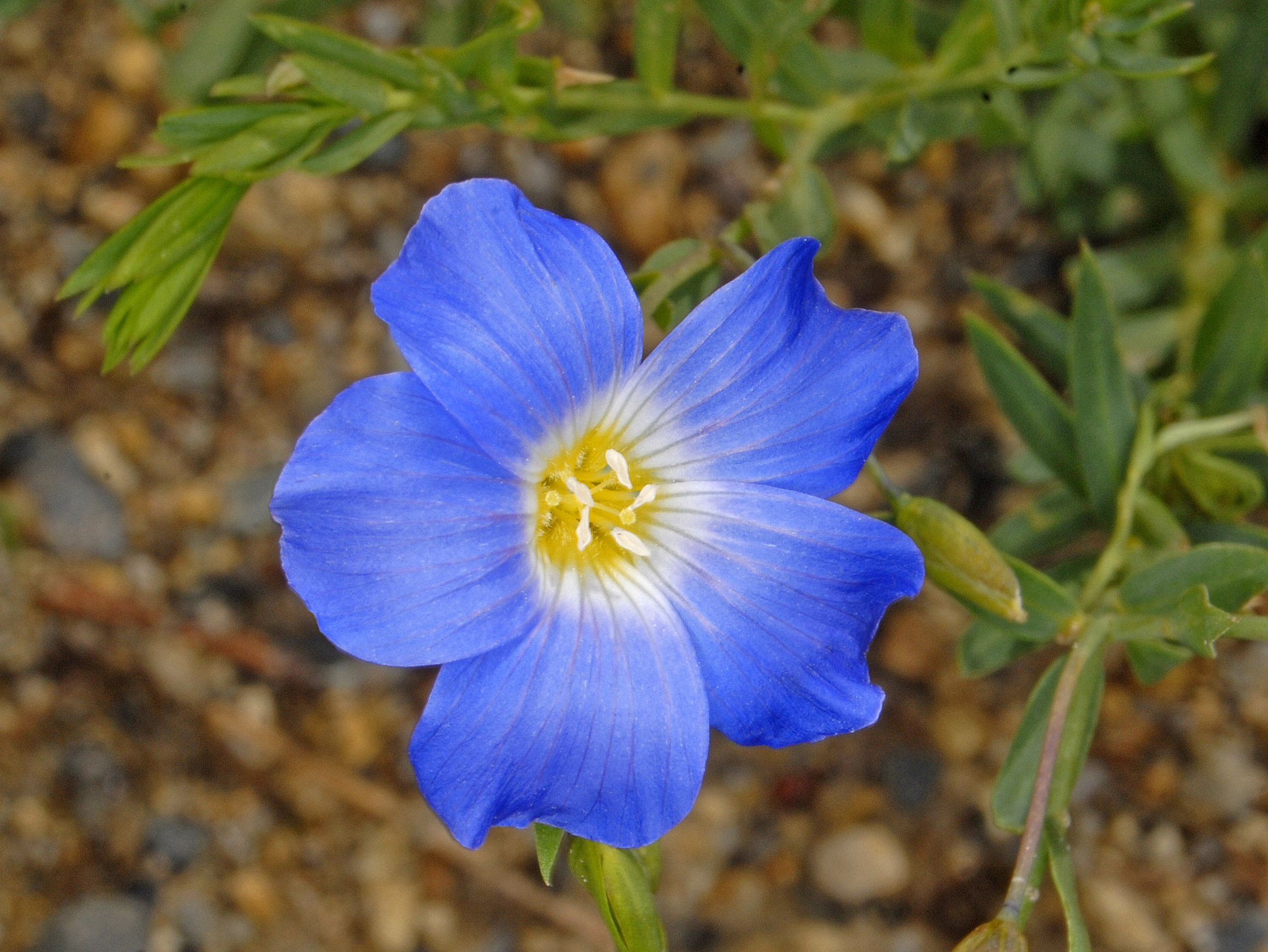
Close-up on a flower of Linum alpinum subsp. julicum

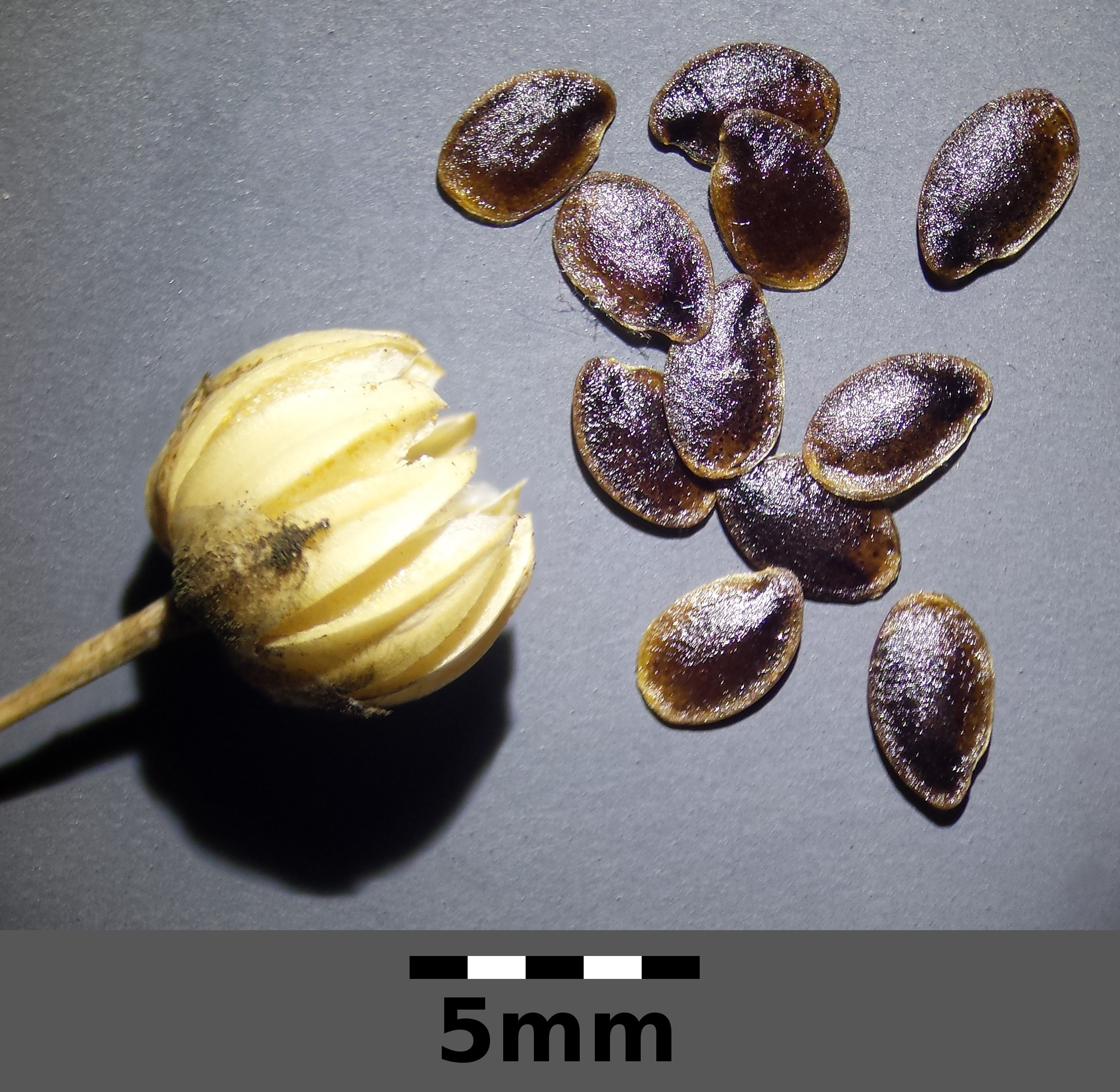
Fruit with seeds

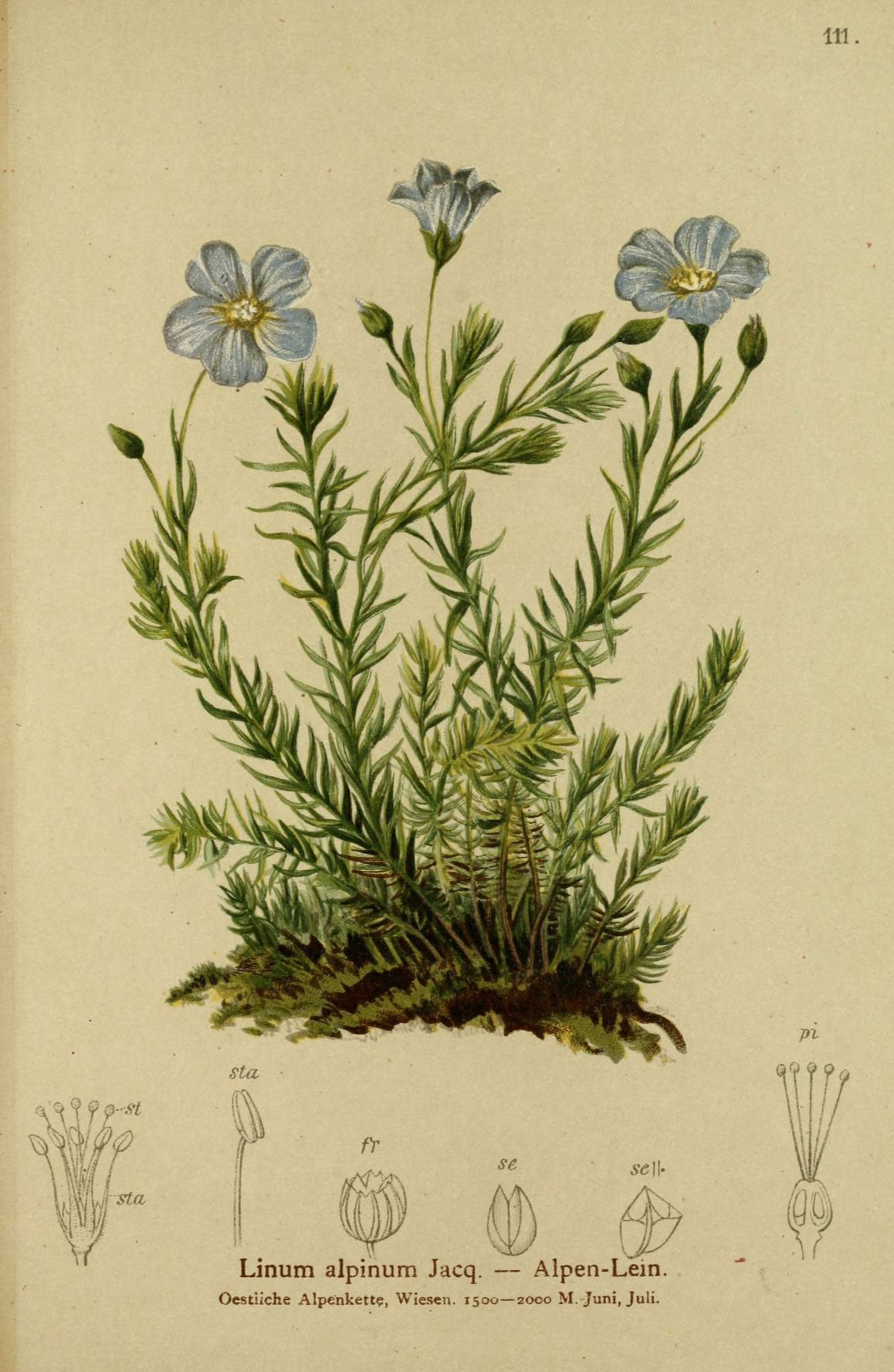
Illustration from Atlas der Alpenflora (1882)
