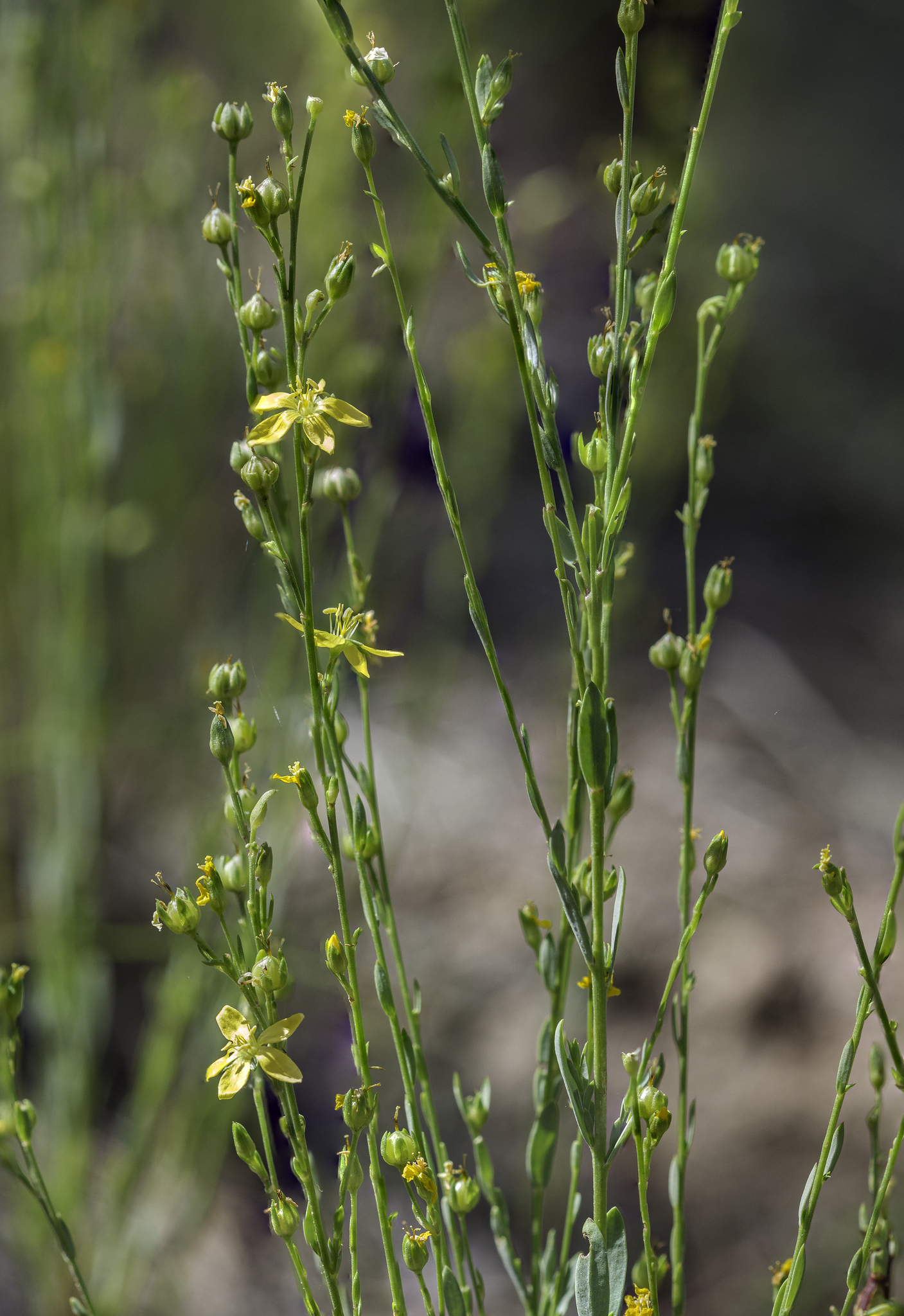

Conservation status
- Apparently Secure (NatureServe)

Scientific classification
- Kingdom: Plantae
- Clade: Tracheophytes
- Clade: Angiosperms
- Clade: Eudicots
- Clade: Rosids
- Order: Malpighiales
- Family: Linaceae
- Genus: Linum
- Species: L. neomexicanum

Binomial name
- Linum neomexicanum Greene

= Linum neomexicanum =

Species of flowering plant

Linum neomexicanum, the New Mexico yellow flax, is a species of flax native to Arizona and New Mexico.

== Description ==
Linum neomexicanum is a perennial herb. It grows 20 to 45cm tall, with slim leafy stems that branch angled upwards. The flowers are yellow and star-shaped, and are frequently larger than the leaves. The Linum neomexicanum can be identified by these yellow flowers as it is the only Linum species with yellow flowers in its range.

== Distribution and habitat ==
Linum neomexicanum is found in Arizona and New Mexico. Linum neomexicanum is found in higher elevation regions between 4,500ft and 9,000ft. It lives in pine forests and oak woodlands.

== Ecology ==
Flowers bloom between June and September. It prefers moist soil and partial shade.
