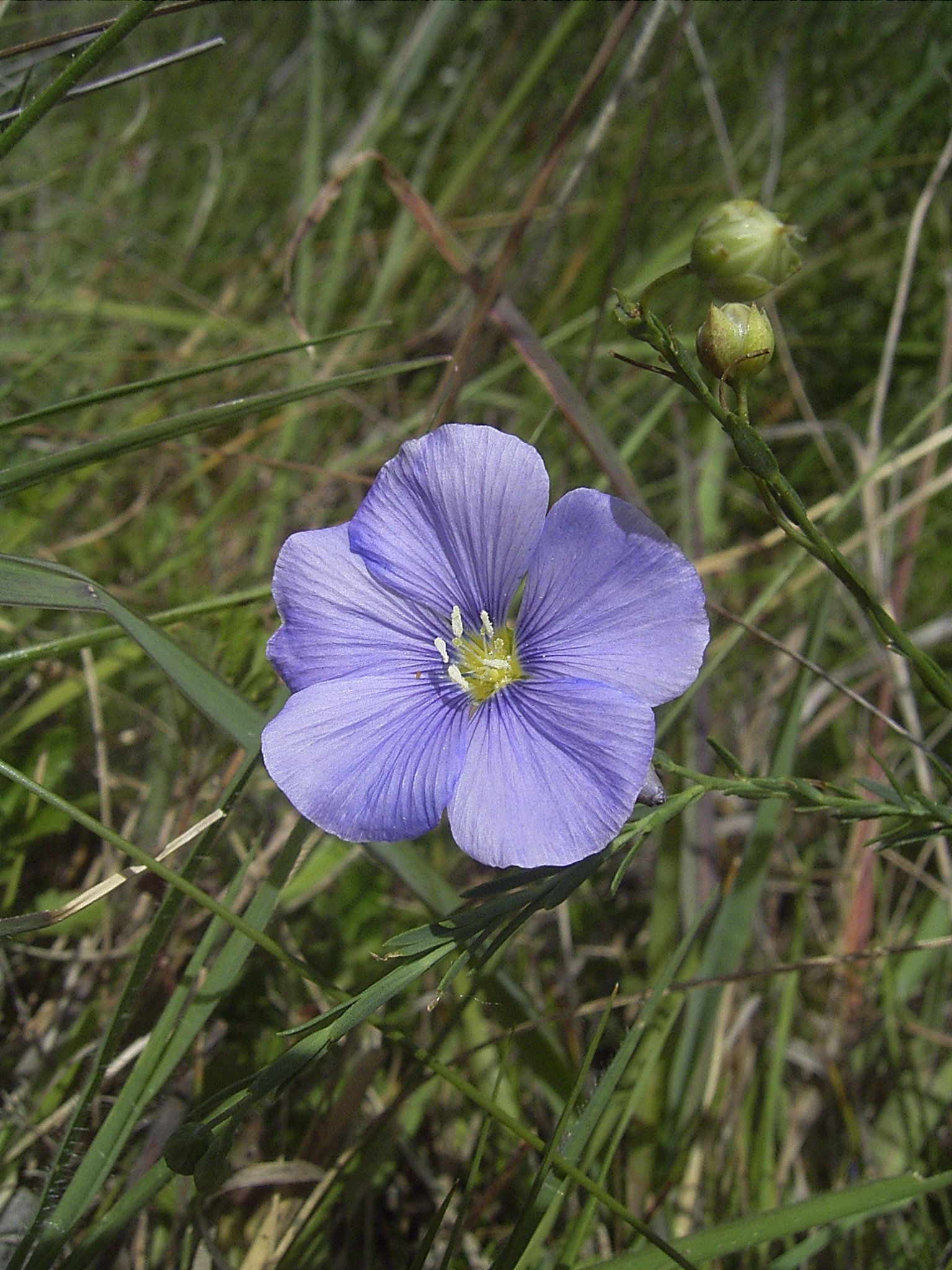

Scientific classification
- Kingdom: Plantae
- Clade: Embryophytes
- Clade: Tracheophytes
- Clade: Angiosperms
- Clade: Eudicots
- Clade: Rosids
- Order: Malpighiales
- Family: Linaceae
- Genus: Linum
- Species: L. austriacum

Binomial name
- Linum austriacum L.

= Linum austriacum =

Species of flowering plant

Linum austriacum, Asian flax, is a species of flowering plant belonging to the family Linaceae.

Its native range is Eastern Central Europe to Western and Central Asia.
