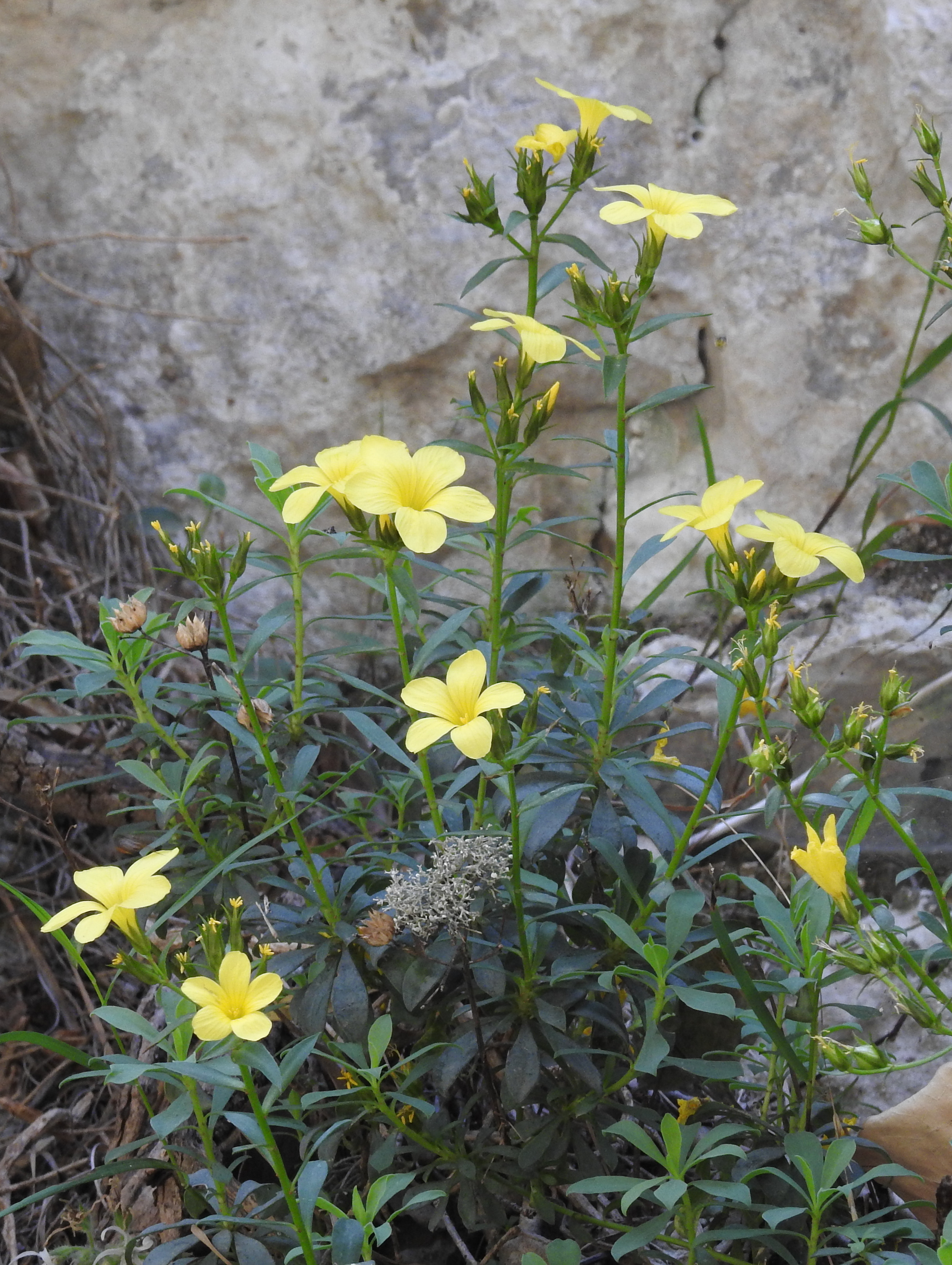

Scientific classification
- Kingdom: Plantae
- Clade: Tracheophytes
- Clade: Angiosperms
- Clade: Eudicots
- Clade: Rosids
- Order: Malpighiales
- Family: Linaceae
- Genus: Linum
- Species: L. arboreum

Binomial name
- Linum arboreum L.

Synonyms
- List: Linum globulariifolium Poir.; Linum simsii Planch.; Xantholinum arboreum (L.) Rchb.

= Linum arboreum =

Species of plant in the genus Linum

Linum arboreum, called tree flax, evergreen flax and shrubby flax, is a species of Linum native to Greece, including Crete and the Aegean Islands, and Turkey. It has gained the Royal Horticultural Society's Award of Garden Merit as an ornamental.
