= Coleophora striolatella =

Scientific classification
- Kingdom: Animalia
- Phylum: Arthropoda
- Clade: Pancrustacea
- Class: Insecta
- Order: Lepidoptera
- Family: Coleophoridae
- Genus: Coleophora
- Species: C. striolatella

Binomial name
- Coleophora striolatella Zeller, 1849

Synonyms
- Coleophora dichroella Toll, 1952; Coleophora moestella Toll, 1952; Coleophora benedictella Chrétien, 1904

Species of moth

Coleophora striolatella is a moth of the family Coleophoridae. It is found from southern France to Italy and from Hungary to Spain.

The larvae feed on Linum narbonense. Full-grown cases are found in April and May.
