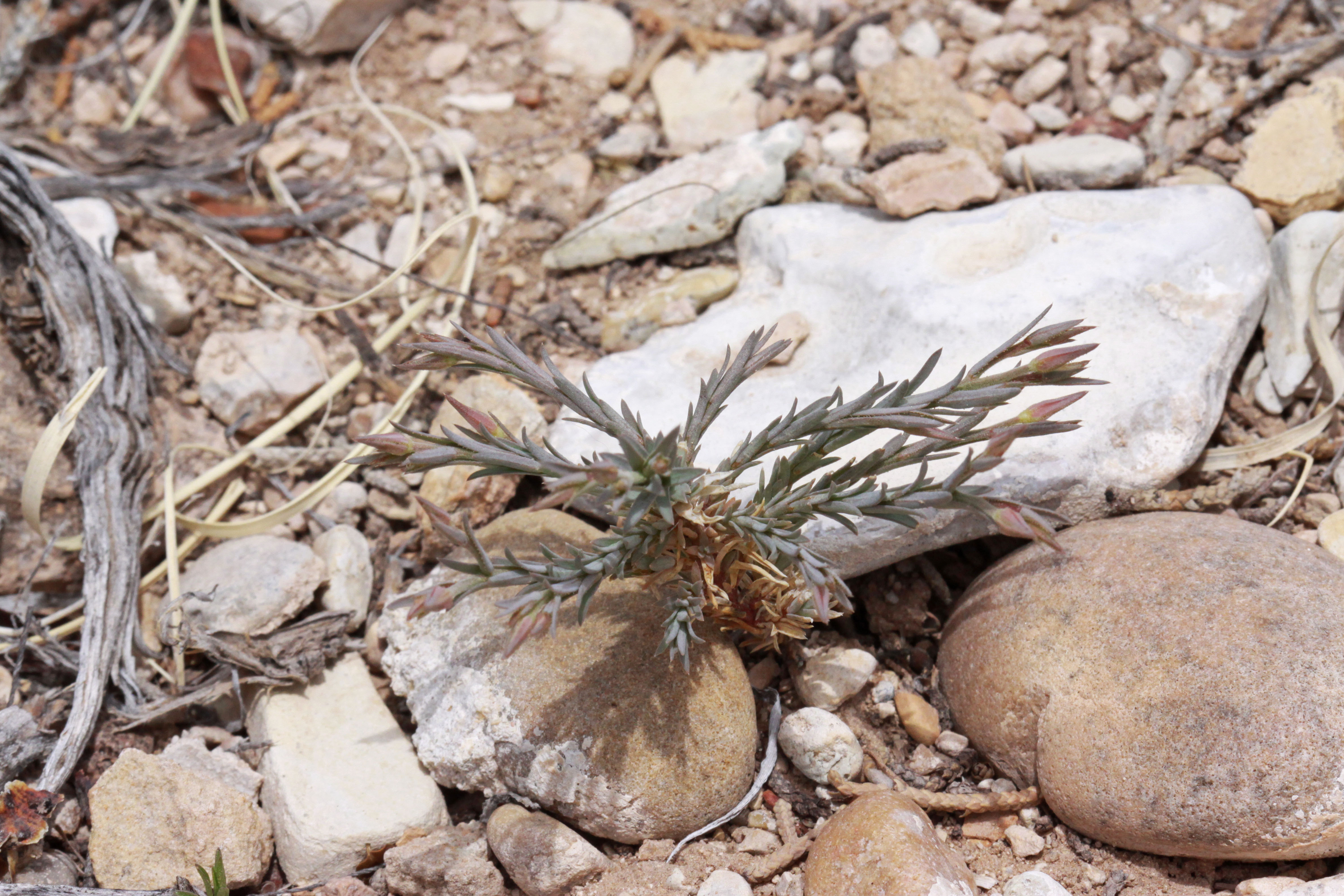

Conservation status
- Secure (NatureServe)

Scientific classification
- Kingdom: Plantae
- Clade: Tracheophytes
- Clade: Angiosperms
- Clade: Eudicots
- Clade: Rosids
- Order: Malpighiales
- Family: Linaceae
- Genus: Linum
- Species: L. puberulum

Binomial name
- Linum puberulum (Engelm.) A.Heller

Synonyms
- List: Cathartolinum puberulum (Engelm.) Small; Cathartolinum vestitum Wooton & Standl.; Linum rigidum var. puberulum Engelm.; Mesynium puberulum (Engelm.) W.A.Weber

= Linum puberulum =

Plant species in the flax family

Linum puberulum is a species of flax known by the common name plains flax. It is native to the western and midwestern United States from California to Nebraska to Texas, where it grows in dry, open habitat including desert, semi-desert, hills and low mountains. It is a downy-haired perennial herb producing an erect, branching stem lined with glandular linear leaves up to about 1 centimeter long. The inflorescence is a wide open cyme of golden yellow to yellow-orange flowers each with five petals 1 to 1.5 centimeters in length. The fruit is a capsule about 4 millimeters wide.

== Uses ==
The Zuni people squeeze the berry juice into the eye for inflammation.
