= Linum floridanum =

Conservation status
- Secure (NatureServe)

Scientific classification
- Kingdom: Plantae
- Clade: Tracheophytes
- Clade: Angiosperms
- Clade: Eudicots
- Clade: Rosids
- Order: Malpighiales
- Family: Linaceae
- Genus: Linum
- Species: L. floridanum

Binomial name
- Linum floridanum (Planch.) Trel.

Synonyms
- Linum virginianum var. floridanum Planch.

Florida yellow flax

Linum floridanum, known commonly as Florida yellow flax or yellow-fruited yellow flax, is a species of flowering perennial native to North America. There are two variations of this species: L. floridanum var. chrysocarpum and L. floridanum var. floridanum. The range of both variations reaches from the southeastern region of North Carolina to Florida and westward to southern Mississippi. Outside of this range, L. floridanum var. floridanum may additionally be found in the West Indies and Louisiana.

L. floridanum reaches a height between 3 and 8 decimeters (approximately 0.98 to 2.62 feet), possessing multiple stems that stand erect. The leaves are most commonly alternately arranged, but may be opposite in some cases, and reach a length between 0.8 and 2.5 centimeters. The flowers possess five petals, 4 to 8 millimeters in length and yellow in color. The seeds produced by L. floridanum are 1 to 1.3 millimeters in length, obovoid to ellipsoid in shape, and brown in color.

This species is believed to have a positive relationship with fire, one study finding that the highest densities of flowering stalks of L. floridanum were observed in an area that had been burned the year prior.
