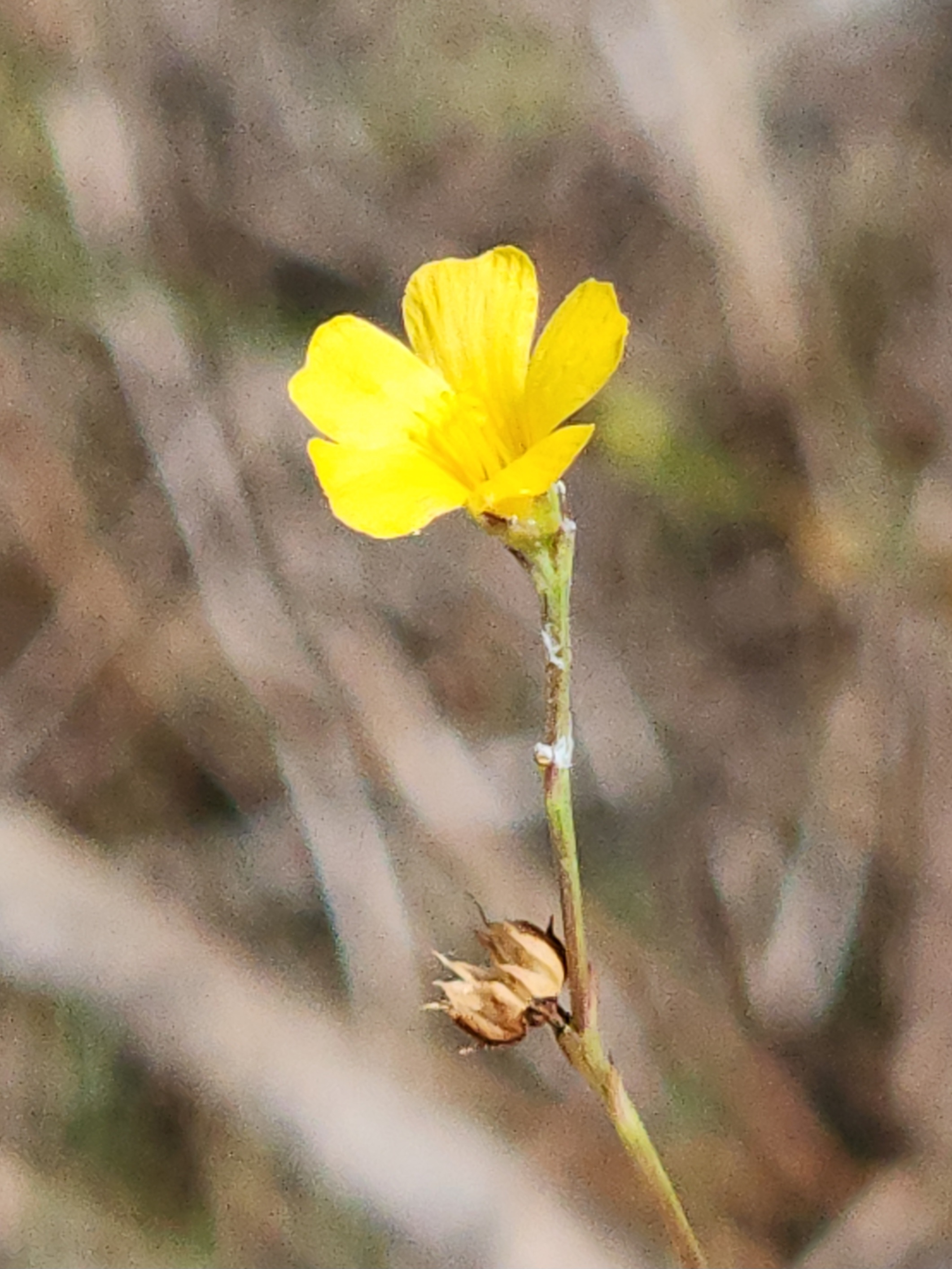
- In bloom in open-canopy rockland habitat on Big Pine Key

Conservation status
- Critically Imperiled (NatureServe)

Scientific classification
- Kingdom: Plantae
- Clade: Tracheophytes
- Clade: Angiosperms
- Clade: Eudicots
- Clade: Rosids
- Order: Malpighiales
- Family: Linaceae
- Genus: Linum
- Species: L. arenicola

Binomial name
- Linum arenicola (Small) H.J.P.Winkl.

Synonyms
- Cathartolinum arenicola Small

= Linum arenicola =

Species of flowering plant

Linum arenicola, known as sand flax, is a flowering plant in the flax family, Linaceae. It is endemic to Florida in the United States, where it is considered an endangered species.

== Conservation ==
The plant is known to only grow in about 14 remaining sites in the extreme southern parts of Florida. It has historically suffered from extensive habitat loss and fragmentation as the majority of the pine rockland has been consumed for development. Additional threats include fire-suppression, invasive species, rising sea levels, hurricanes & their storm surge, and roadway maintenance.
