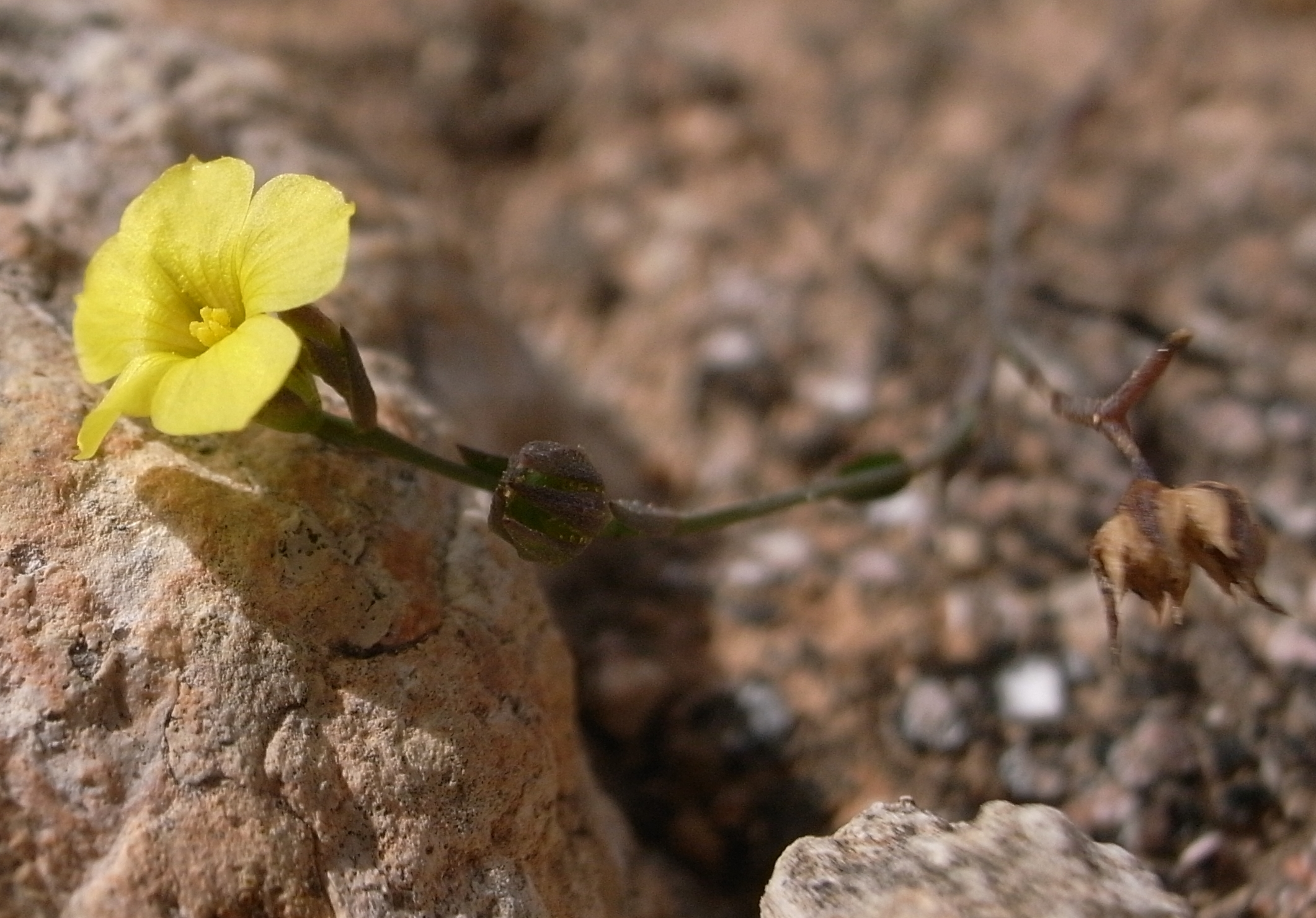

Scientific classification
- Kingdom: Plantae
- Clade: Tracheophytes
- Clade: Angiosperms
- Clade: Eudicots
- Clade: Rosids
- Order: Malpighiales
- Family: Linaceae
- Genus: Linum
- Species: L. trigynum

Binomial name
- Linum trigynum L.

Synonyms
- Linum gallicum

= Linum trigynum =

Species of plant

Linum trigynum, the French flax, is a species of annual herb in the family Linaceae. It is native to Southern Europe, Western Asia, North Africa, the Horn of Africa and some oceanic islands, such as Madeira, Canary Islands and Socotra. They have a self-supporting growth form. Individuals can grow to 0.18 m tall.

== Sources ==
This article incorporates text from a free content work. Licensed under CC0 (license statement/permission). Text taken from Linum trigynum. Encyclopedia of Life.
