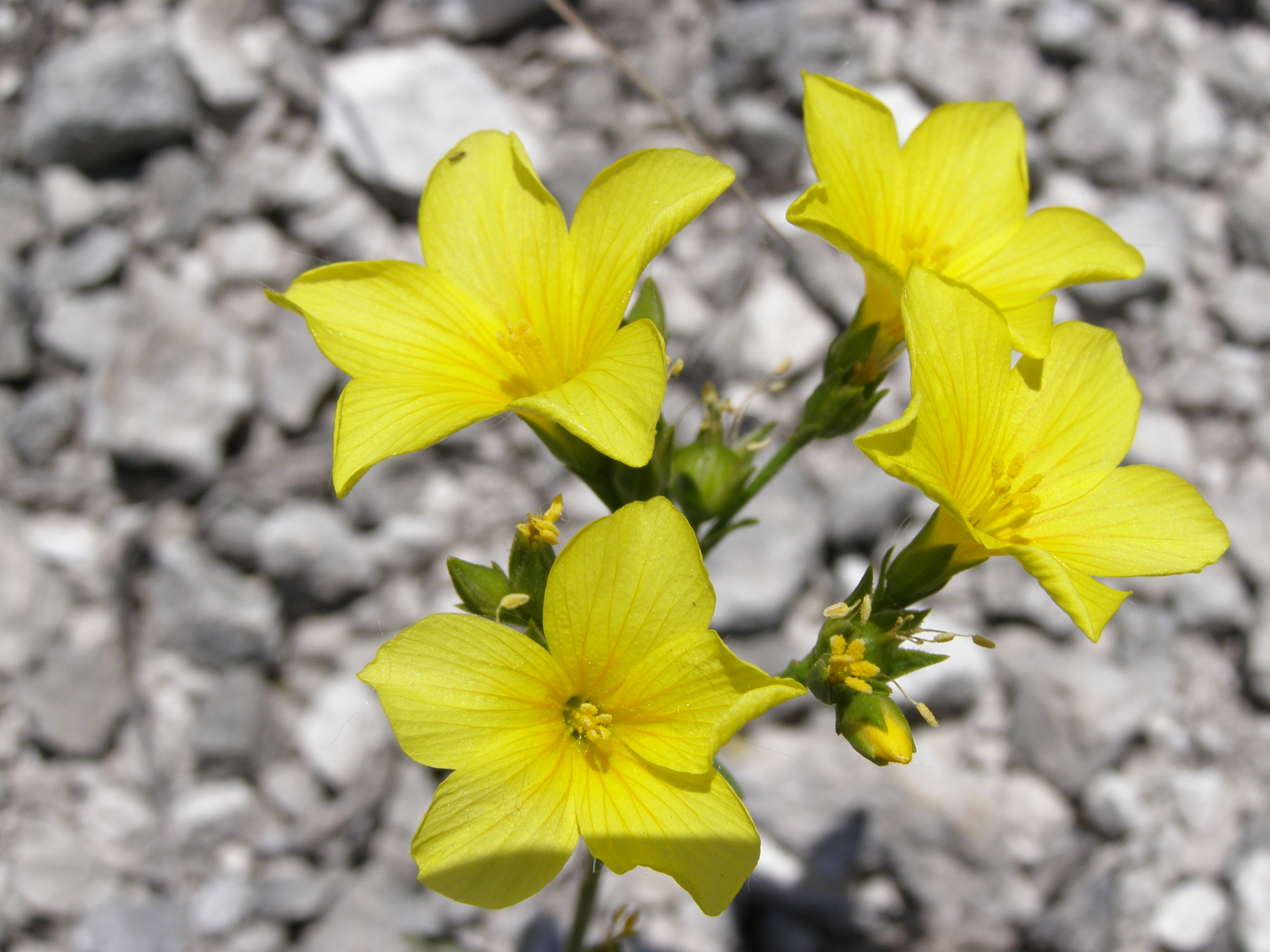
- Flowers
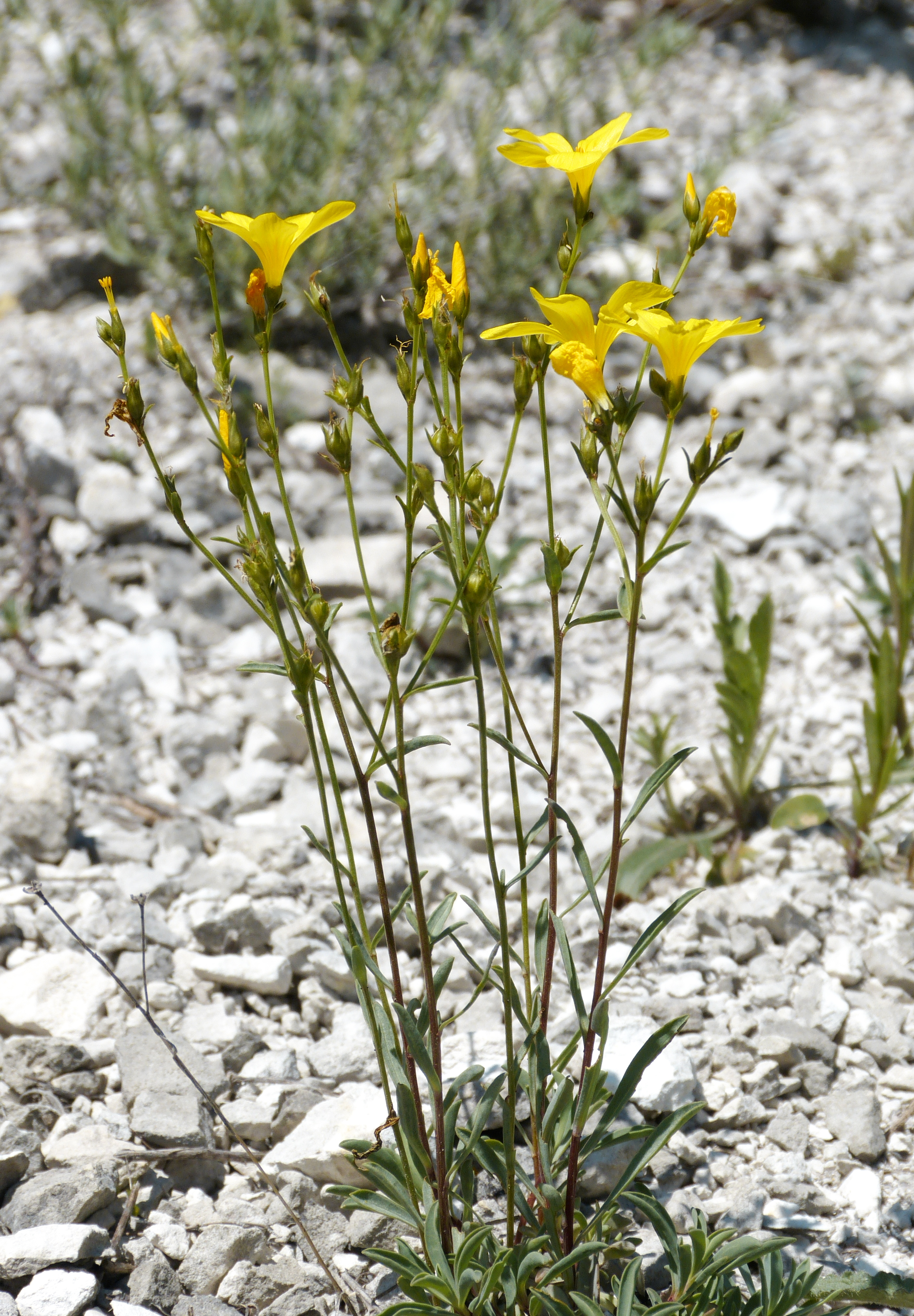
- Habit

Scientific classification
- Kingdom: Plantae
- Clade: Tracheophytes
- Clade: Angiosperms
- Clade: Eudicots
- Clade: Rosids
- Order: Malpighiales
- Family: Linaceae
- Genus: Linum
- Species: L. ucranicum

Binomial name
- Linum ucranicum (Griseb. ex Planch.) Czern.

Synonyms
- Linum flavum var. ucranicum Griseb. ex Planch.; Linum ucranicum subsp. uralense (Juz.) T.V.Egorova; Linum uralense Juz.

= Linum ucranicum =

Species of plant in the family Linaceae

Linum ucranicum is a species of flowering plant in the flax genus Linum, family Linaceae, native to Ukraine and parts of European Russia. It is confined to chalk outcrops.
