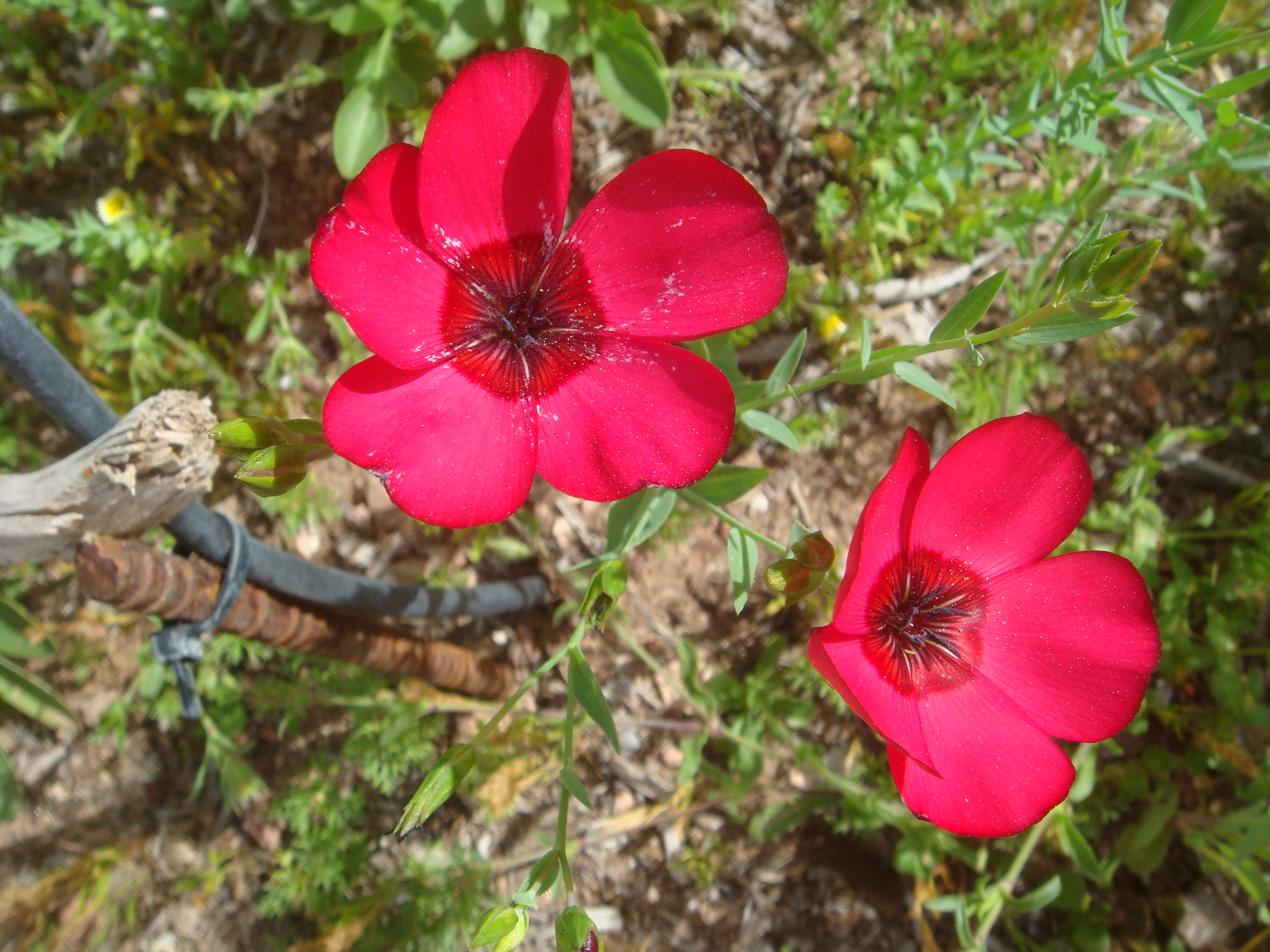

Scientific classification
- Kingdom: Plantae
- Clade: Embryophytes
- Clade: Tracheophytes
- Clade: Angiosperms
- Clade: Eudicots
- Clade: Rosids
- Order: Malpighiales
- Family: Linaceae
- Genus: Linum
- Species: L. grandiflorum

Binomial name
- Linum grandiflorum Desf.

Synonyms
- Adenolinum grandiflorum (Desf.) W.A.Weber

= Linum grandiflorum =

Plant species in the family

Linum grandiflorum is a species of flax known by several common names, including flowering flax, red flax, scarlet flax, and crimson flax. It is native to Algeria and Tunisia, but it is known elsewhere in Northern Africa, Southern Europe and in several locations in North America as an introduced species. It is an annual herb producing an erect, branching stem lined with waxy, lance-shaped leaves 1 to 2 centimeters long. The inflorescence bears flowers on pedicels several centimeters long. The flower has 5 red petals each up to 3 centimeters long and stamens tipped with anthers bearing light blue pollen. It can on occasion be found as a casual well outside its normal established range; records from the British Isles, for example, are reasonably frequent (as per the latest BSBI atlas) but, grown as an annual, it rarely persists for more than one season.

== Cultivation ==
A popular garden plant, L. grandiflorum has been cultivated in a number of colours such as salmon. Some varieties are known as L. grandiflorum rubrum, L. grandiflorum var. rubrum or L. grandiflorum 'Rubrum'. Other varieties include Bright Eyes.

== Sources ==
- "Scarlet Flax". Paghat's Garden. Archived from the original on August 12, 2004.
- Murielle's Garden: Linum grandiflorum
