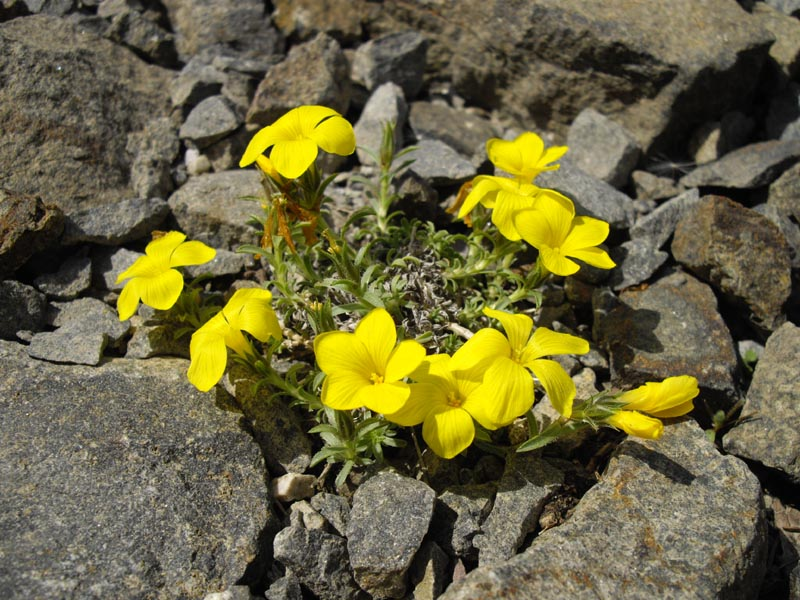

Scientific classification
- Kingdom: Plantae
- Clade: Tracheophytes
- Clade: Angiosperms
- Clade: Eudicots
- Clade: Rosids
- Order: Malpighiales
- Family: Linaceae
- Genus: Linum
- Species: L. cariense

Binomial name
- Linum cariense Boiss.

= Linum cariense =

Species of flowering plant

Linum cariense is a species of flowering plant in the family Linaceae which is endemic to Turkey.

== Description ==
Linum cariense is a small perennial plant which grows in a cushion manner from 1–6 cm (0.39–2.36 in). The leaves are usually a dull grey-blue color and are 5–12 mm (0.20–0.47 in) long with tiny hairs. Each leaf is tipped by what appears to be a small brown gland. Each flower is yellow and approximately 1.5–2.5 cm (0.59–0.98 in) across. The flowers are typically in clusters of three or more, differentiating the species from the very similar Linum verruciferum which has singular flowers.
