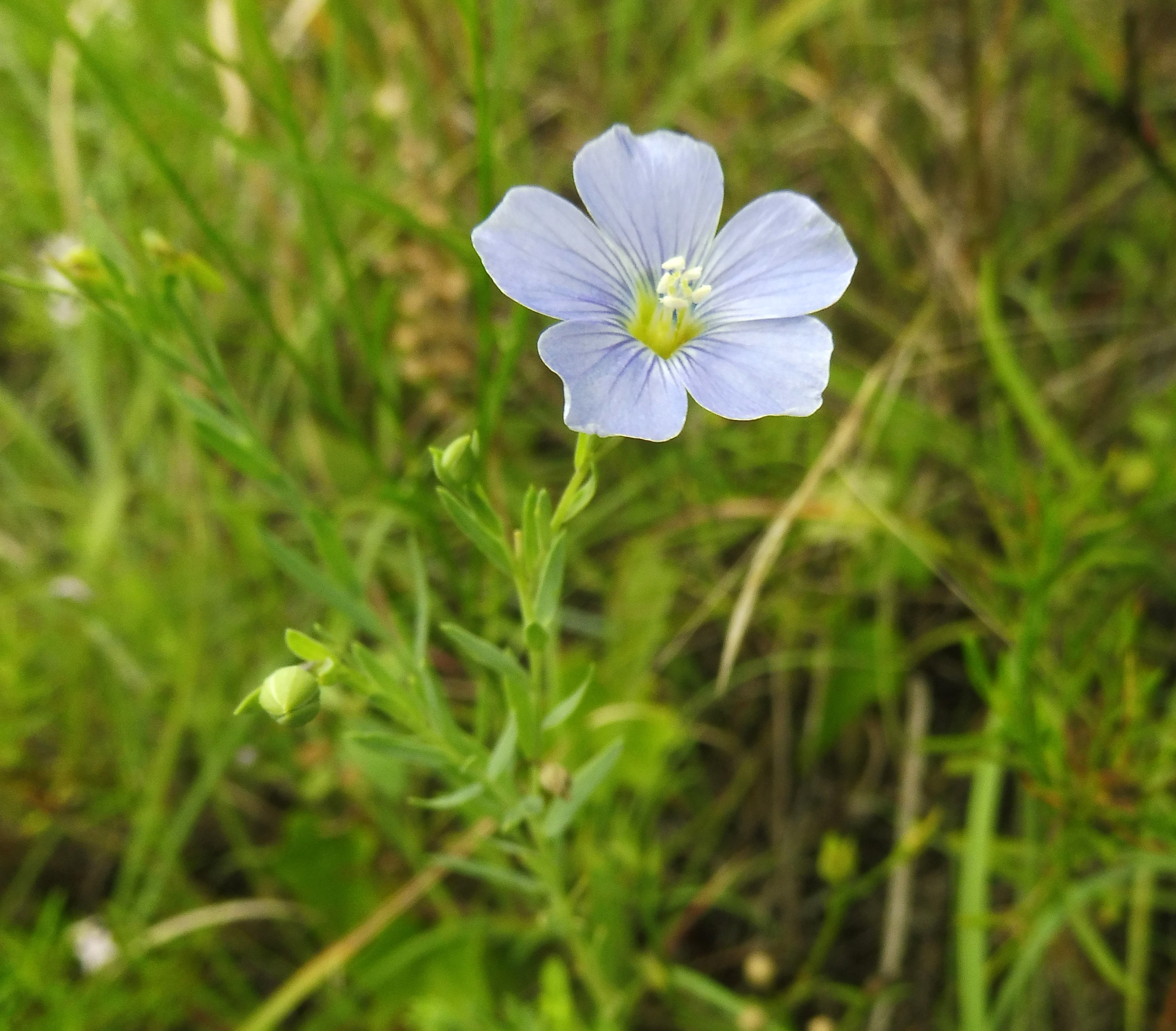

Conservation status
- Secure (NatureServe)

Scientific classification
- Kingdom: Plantae
- Clade: Tracheophytes
- Clade: Angiosperms
- Clade: Eudicots
- Clade: Rosids
- Order: Malpighiales
- Family: Linaceae
- Genus: Linum
- Species: L. pratense

Binomial name
- Linum pratense (Norton) Small

Synonyms
- Adenolinum pratense (Norton) W.A.Weber; Linum lewisii var. pratense Norton

= Linum pratense =

Plant species in the flax family

Linum pratense, commonly called meadow flax, is a species of flowering plant in the flax family (Linaceae). It is native to the United States, where it is found in the south-central and southwestern regions of the country. Its natural habitat consists of dry, open prairies over calcareous or sandy soil. It can be found in both intact and disturbed communities.

Linum pratense is a slender, erect annual. It blooms in spring through early summer, producing pale blue flowers. This species bears a strong resemblance to Linum lewisii, and they are known to intergrade in areas where their ranges overlap. Linum pratense can be distinguished by its annual habit, shorter styles, and obtuse capsule tips. In contrast, Linum lewisii is a perennial with longer styles and acute capsule tips.
