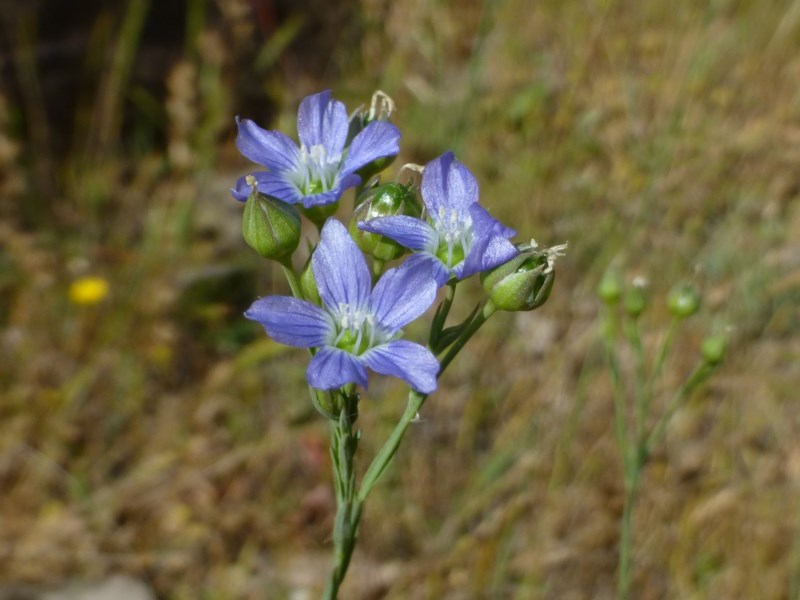
- Linum marginale in the Aranda Bushland

Scientific classification
- Kingdom: Plantae
- Clade: Tracheophytes
- Clade: Angiosperms
- Clade: Eudicots
- Clade: Rosids
- Order: Malpighiales
- Family: Linaceae
- Genus: Linum
- Species: L. marginale

Binomial name
- Linum marginale A.Cunn.

= Linum marginale =

Native flax

Species of flowering plant

Linum marginale, commonly known as native flax or wild flax, is a species of flowering plant in the family Linaceae and is endemic to Australia. It is a perennial herb with few branches, linear leaves, and blue flowers with five usually blue petals with darker veins.

== Description ==
Linum marginale is a glabrous, often glaucous, perennial herb that typically grows to a height of 10–60 cm (3.9–23.6 in) and has a single stem or a few, branching at the base. The leaves are linear to narrow elliptic, 5–20 mm (0.20–0.79 in) long and 1–3 mm (0.039–0.118 in) wide with a single vein. The flowers are borne singly or in loose panicles on the ends of the stem, each flower on a pedicel 13–25 mm (0.51–0.98 in) long. The sepals are egg-shaped, 3–6 mm (0.12–0.24 in) long with thin edges, the petals are usually blue, rarely white, sometimes with darker veins, 8–12 mm (0.31–0.47 in) long and the anthers are white. Flowering occurs in spring and summer and the fruit is a more or less spherical capsule 3–6 mm (0.12–0.24 in) in diameter and containing brown seeds.

== Taxonomy ==
Linum marginale was first formally described in 1825 by Allan Cunningham in Barron Field's Geographical Memoirs on New South Wales. The specific epithet (marginale) means "along the edge", referring to the sepals.

== Distribution and habitat ==
Native flax occurs in all Australian states, but not the Northern Territory. It is widespread in grassland, woodland and forest, sometimes on the edge of swamps and is found in most regions of New South Wales and Victoria, but only in the south-west of Western Australia and the south-east of South Australia.
