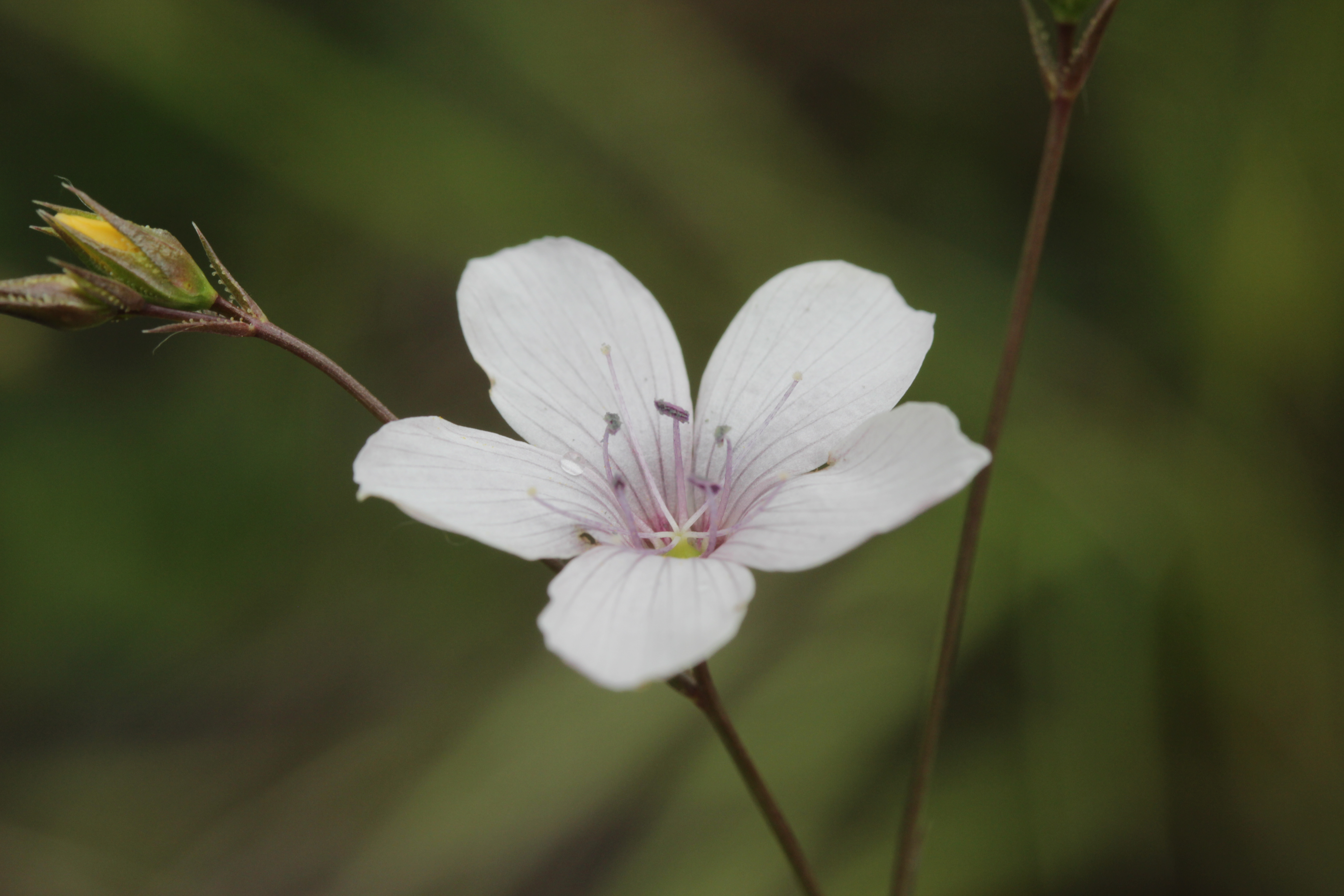
- Close-up of flower
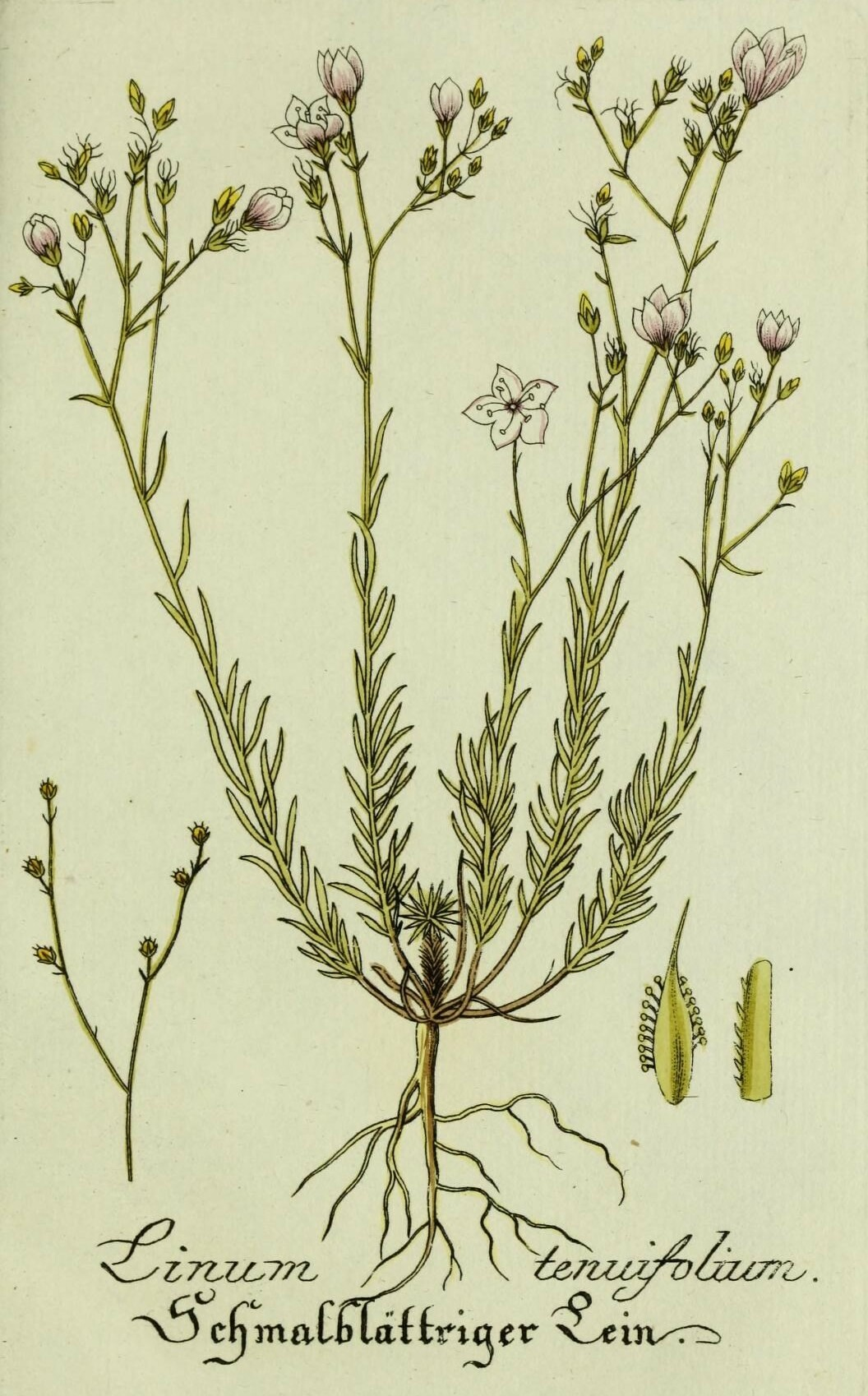
- Botanical illustration

Scientific classification
- Kingdom: Plantae
- Clade: Tracheophytes
- Clade: Angiosperms
- Clade: Eudicots
- Clade: Rosids
- Order: Malpighiales
- Family: Linaceae
- Genus: Linum
- Species: L. tenuifolium

Binomial name
- Linum tenuifolium L.

Synonyms
- Cathartolinum tenuifolium (L.) Rchb.; Leucolinum tenuifolium (L.) Fourr.; Linum biforme Bonnier & Layens; Linum biforme f. tenuifolium (L.) Clavaud; Linum biforme subsp. tenuifolium (L.) Bonnier & Layens; Linum cilicicum Fenzl

= Linum tenuifolium =

Species of plant

Linum tenuifolium, the narrow-leaved flax, is a species of flowering plant in the family Linaceae. It is native to central and southern Europe, the Black Sea and Caucasus area, and the northern Middle East as far as northwestern Iran. A perennial, it is generally found in rocky, alkaline, dry situations, and is thought to have spread out from relict European rocky steppes.

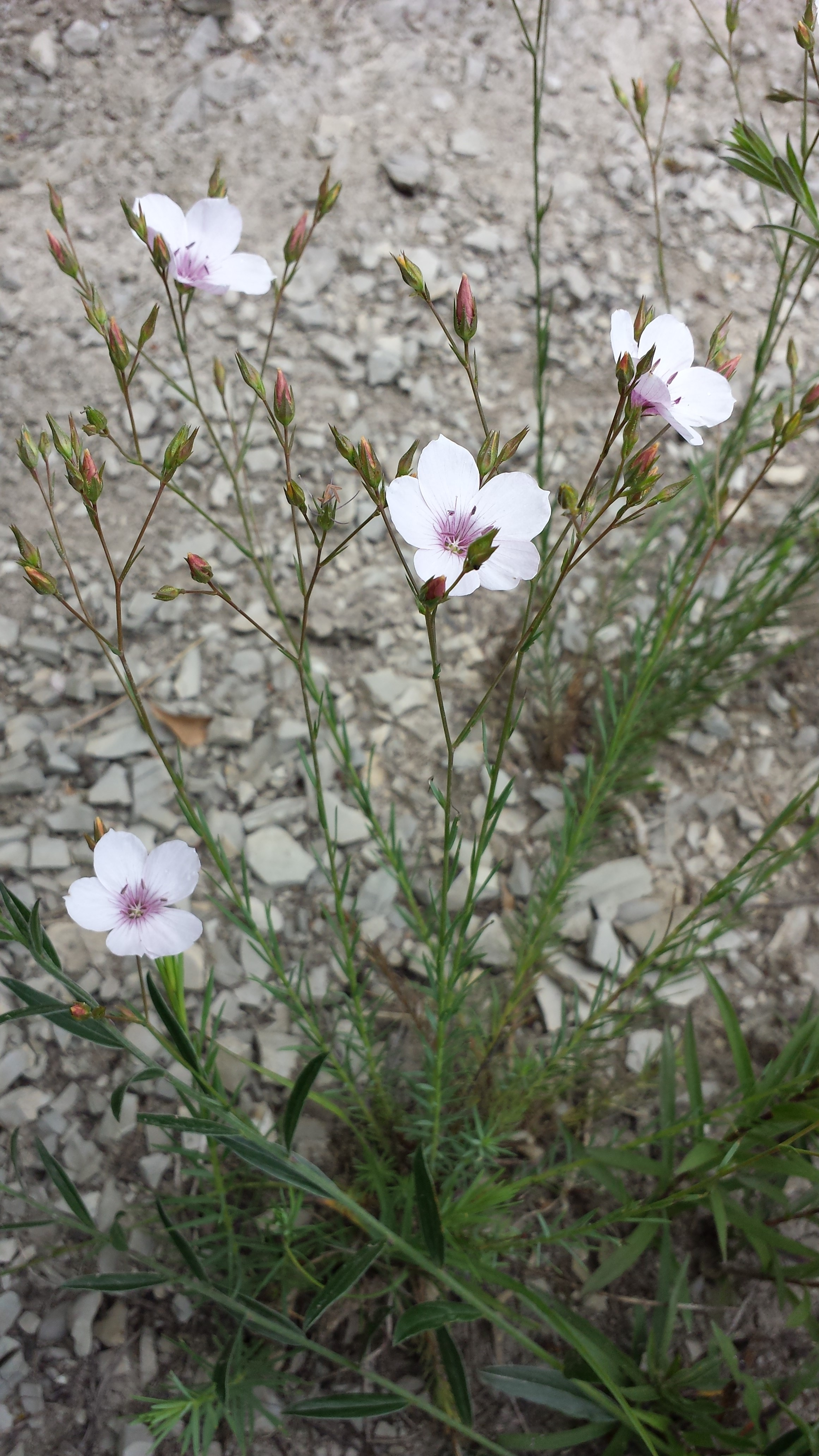
Habit

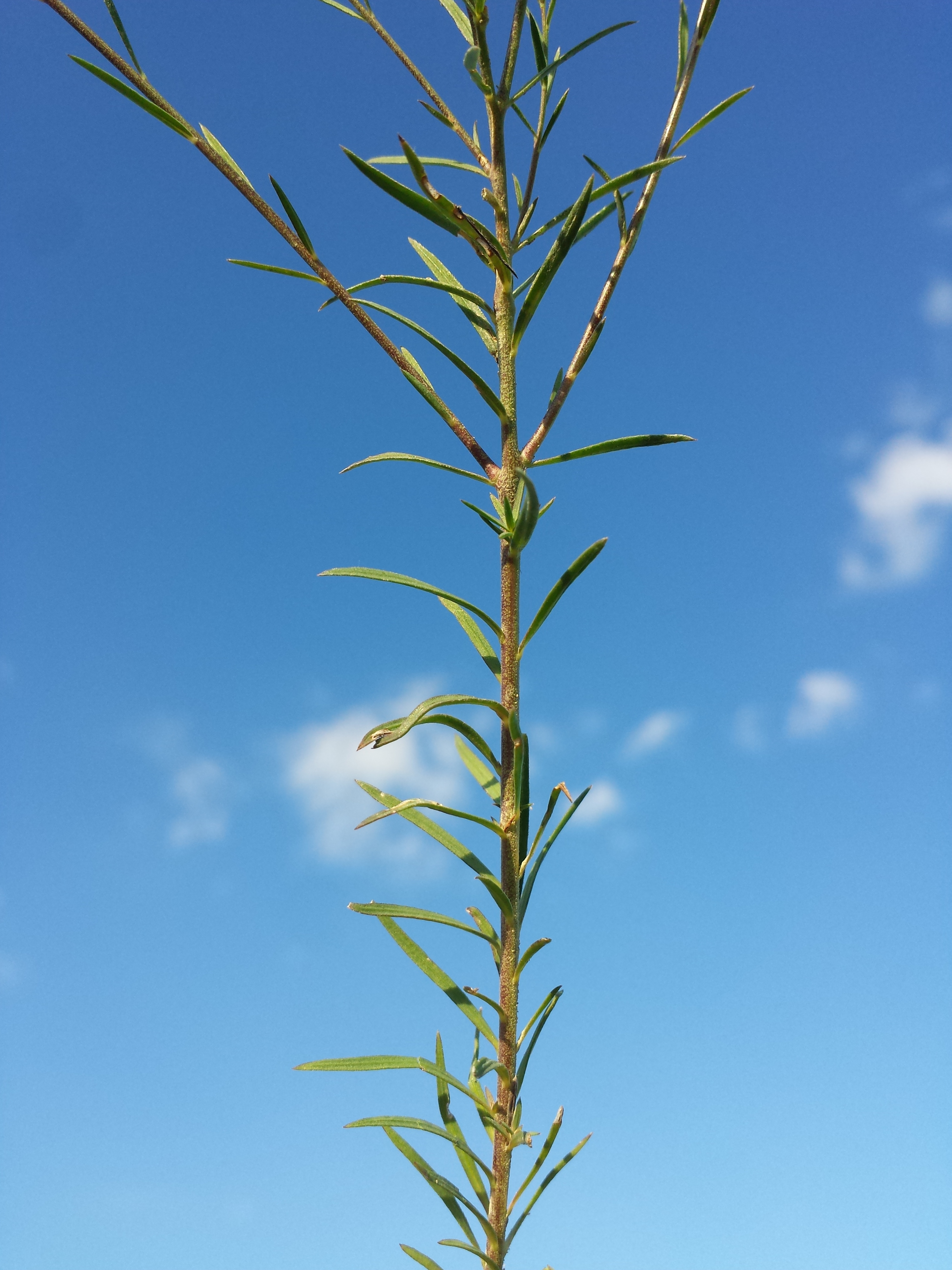
Stem

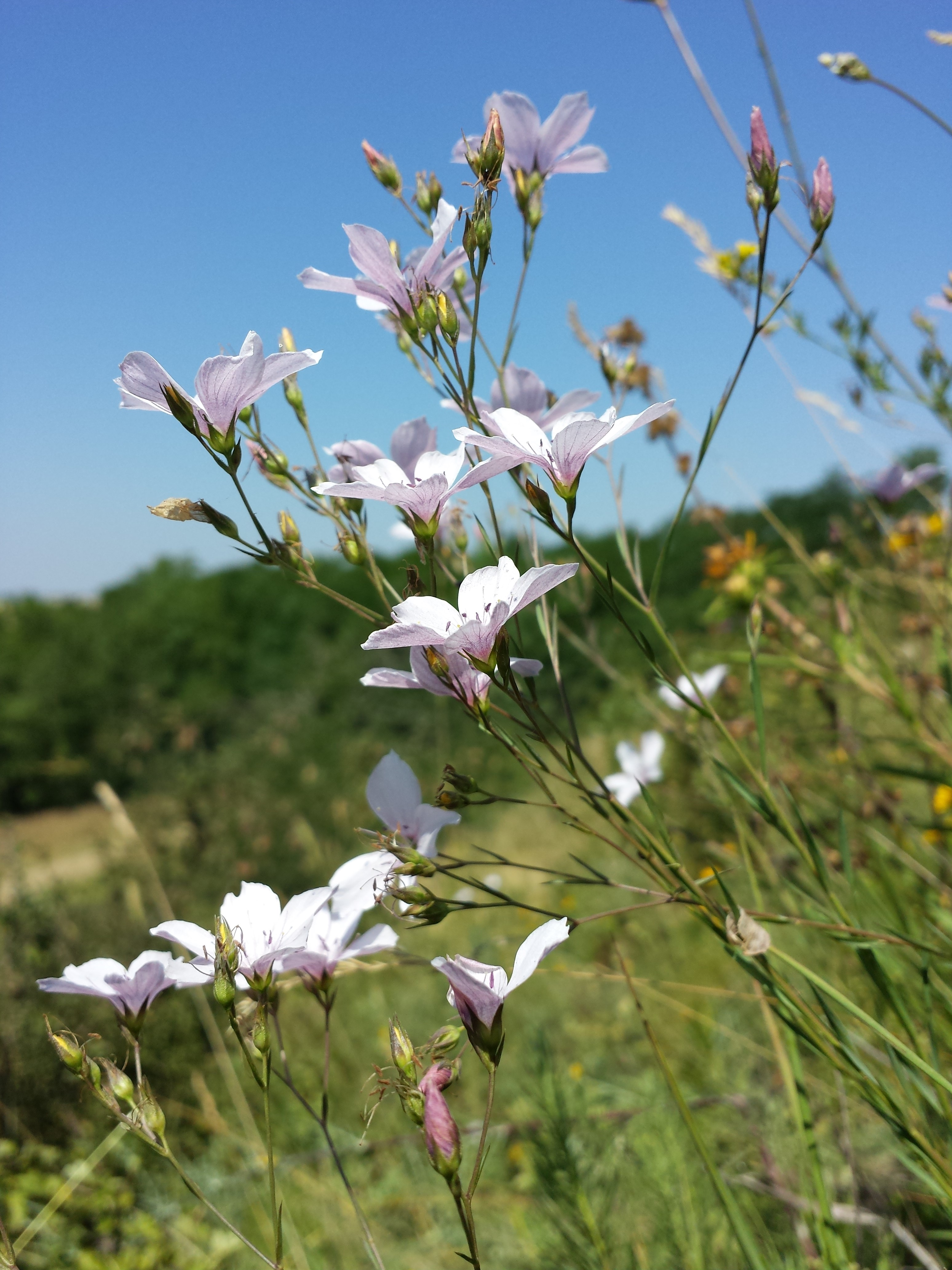
Side view

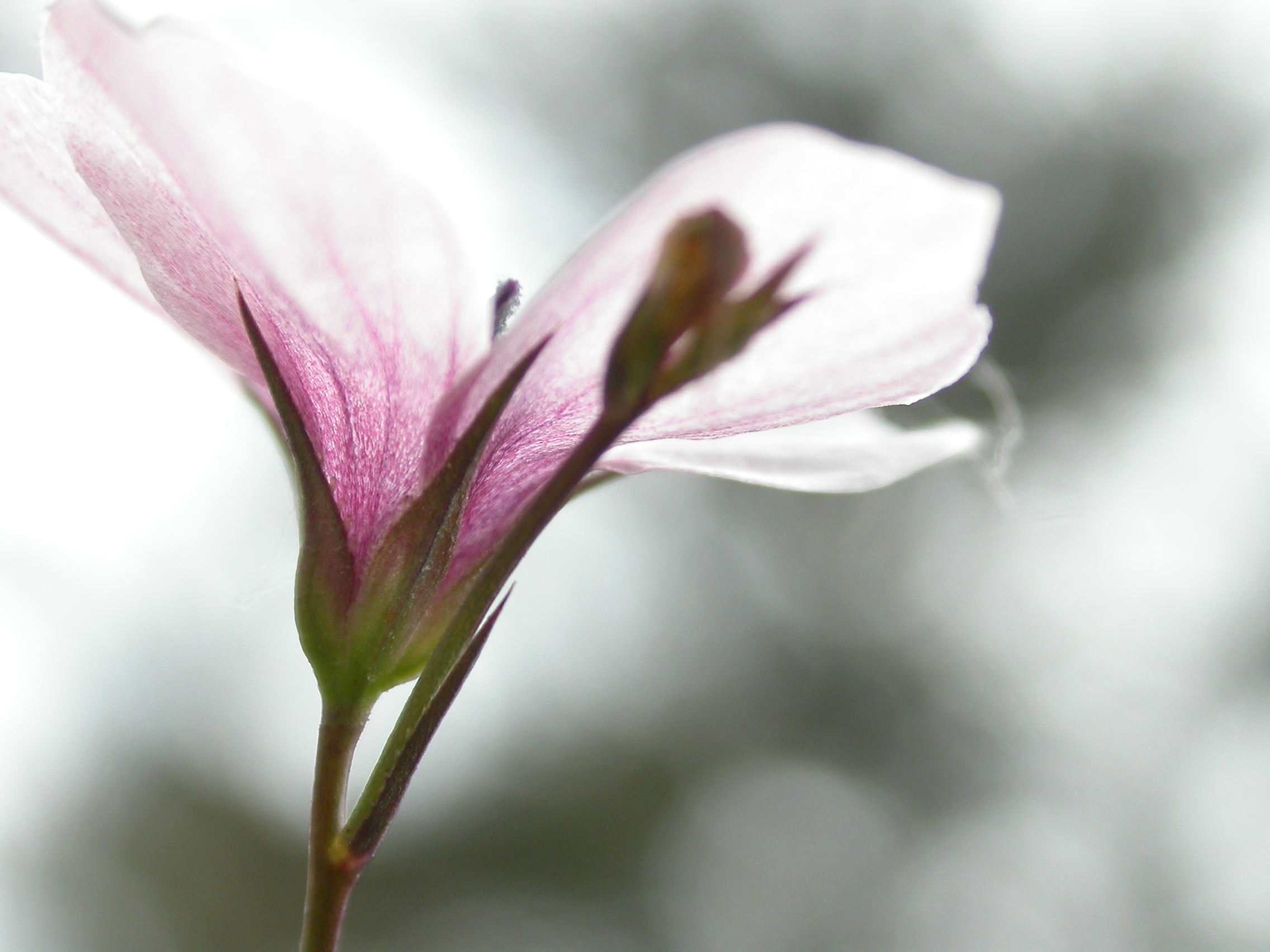
Extreme close-up of flower

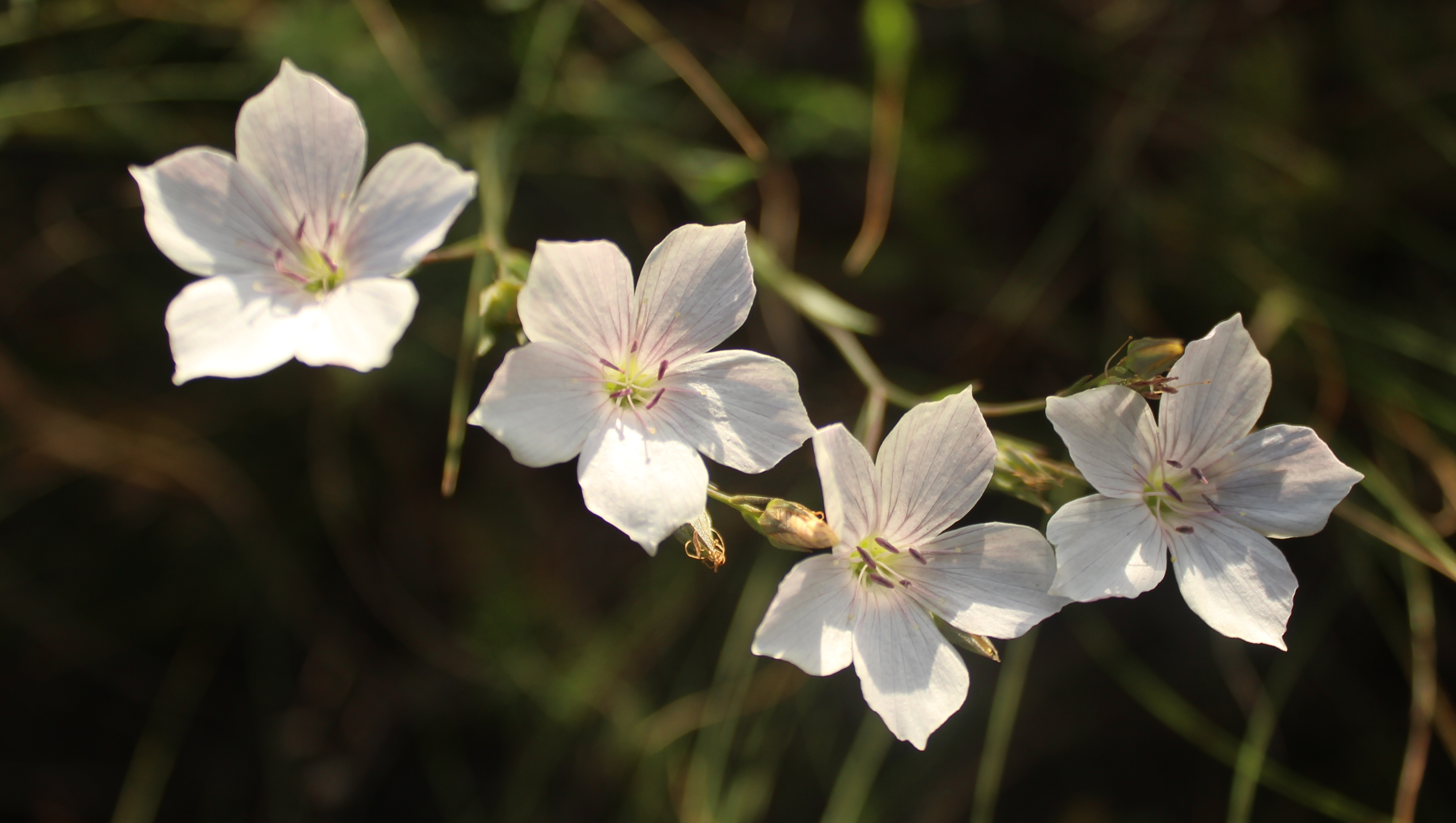
Flowers

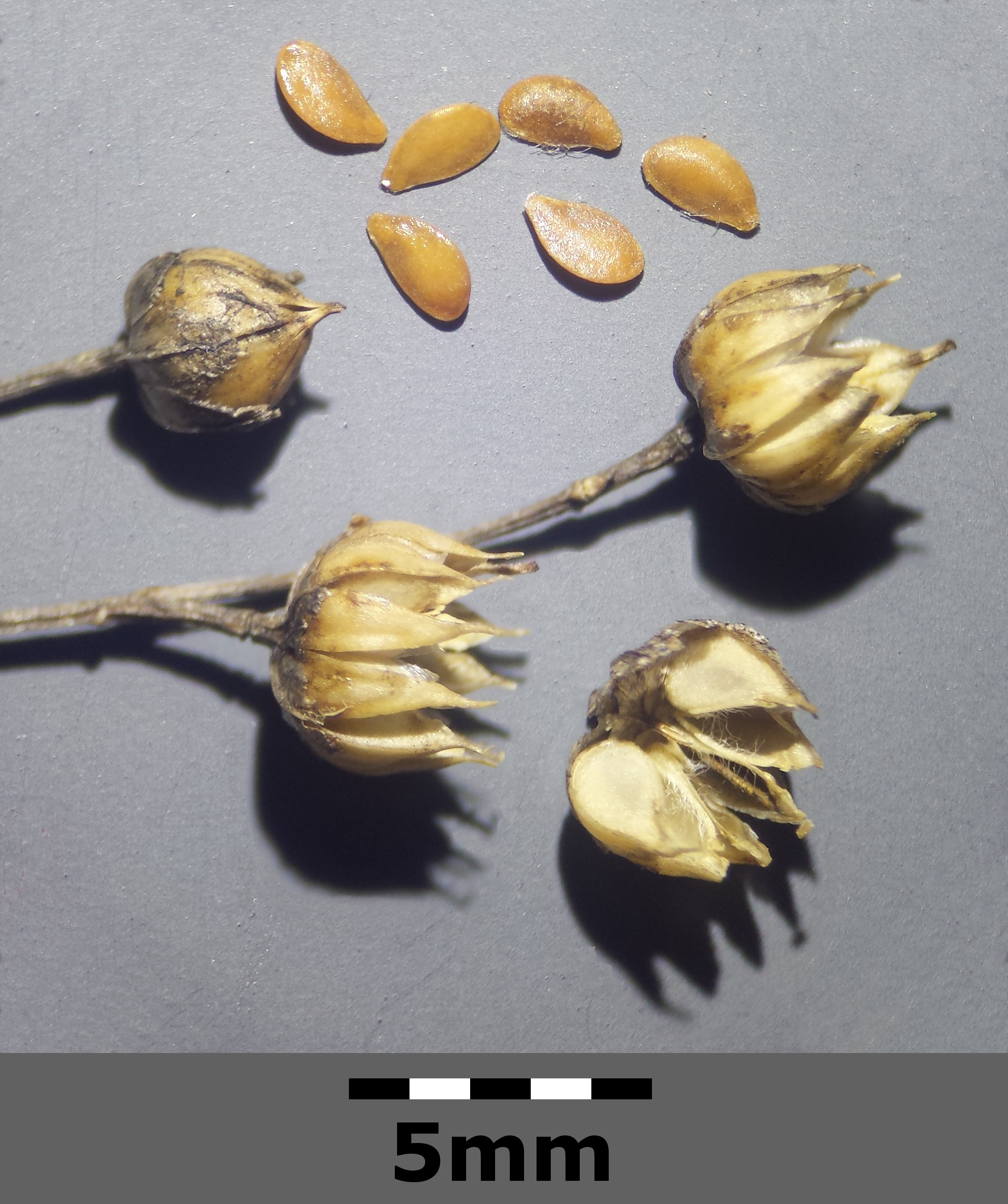
Seedheads and seeds
