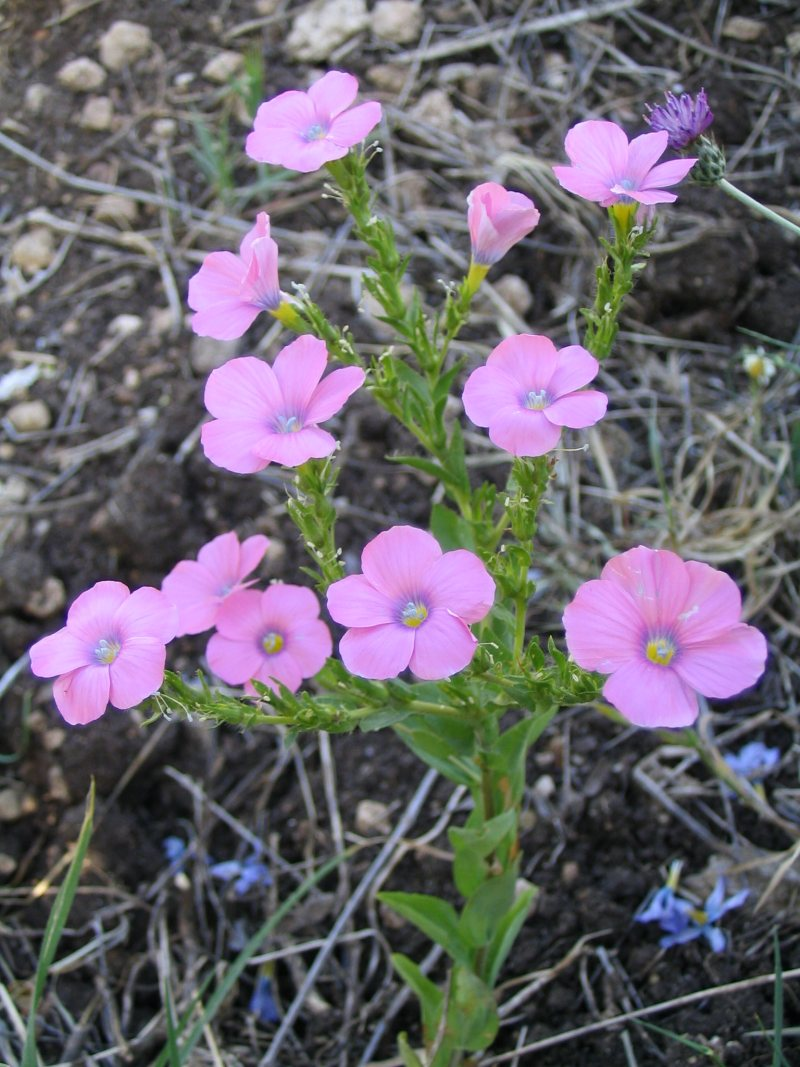

Scientific classification
- Kingdom: Plantae
- Clade: Tracheophytes
- Clade: Angiosperms
- Clade: Eudicots
- Clade: Rosids
- Order: Malpighiales
- Family: Linaceae
- Genus: Linum
- Species: L. pubescens

Binomial name
- Linum pubescens Banks & Sol.

= Linum pubescens =

Species of flowering plant

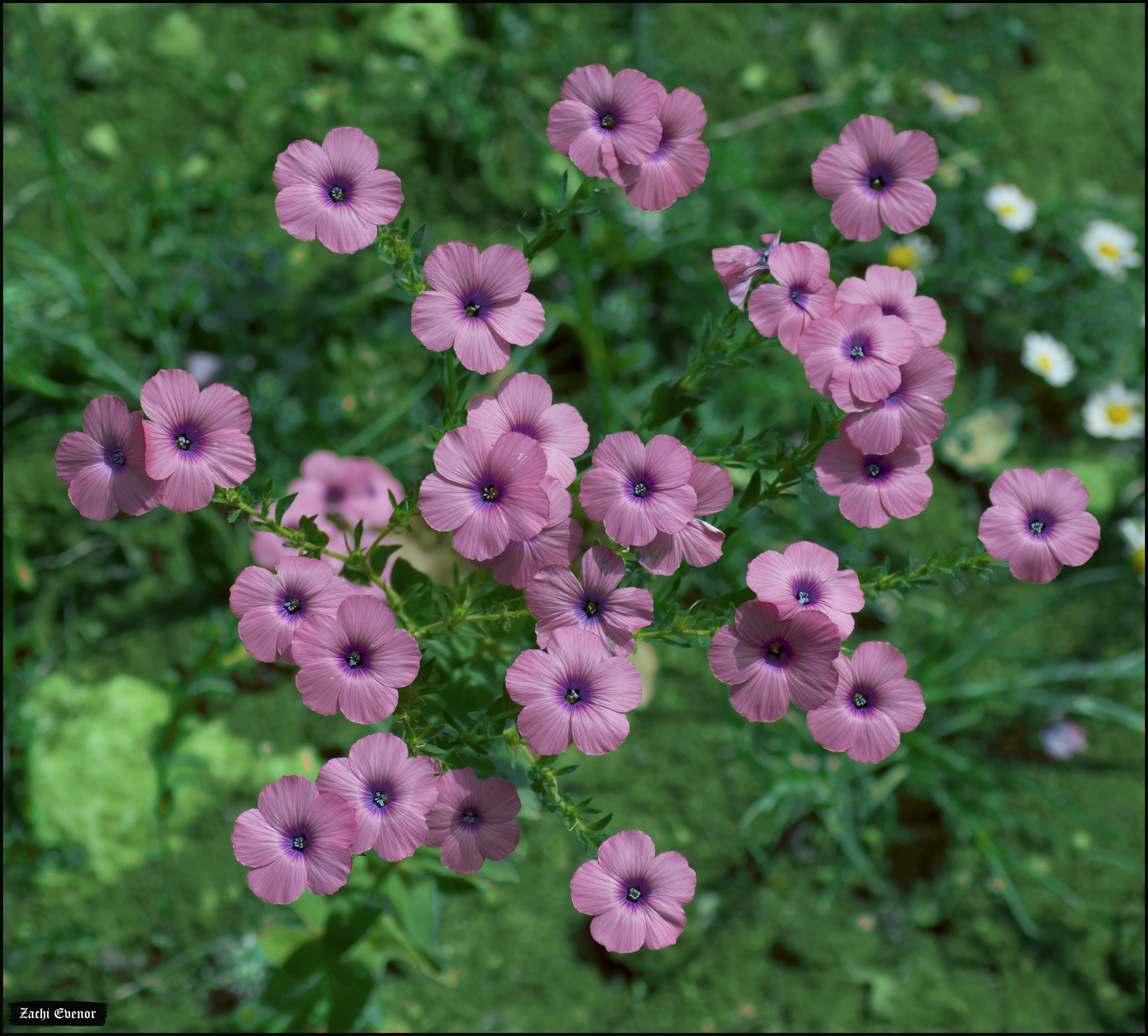
Many flowers on the same plant

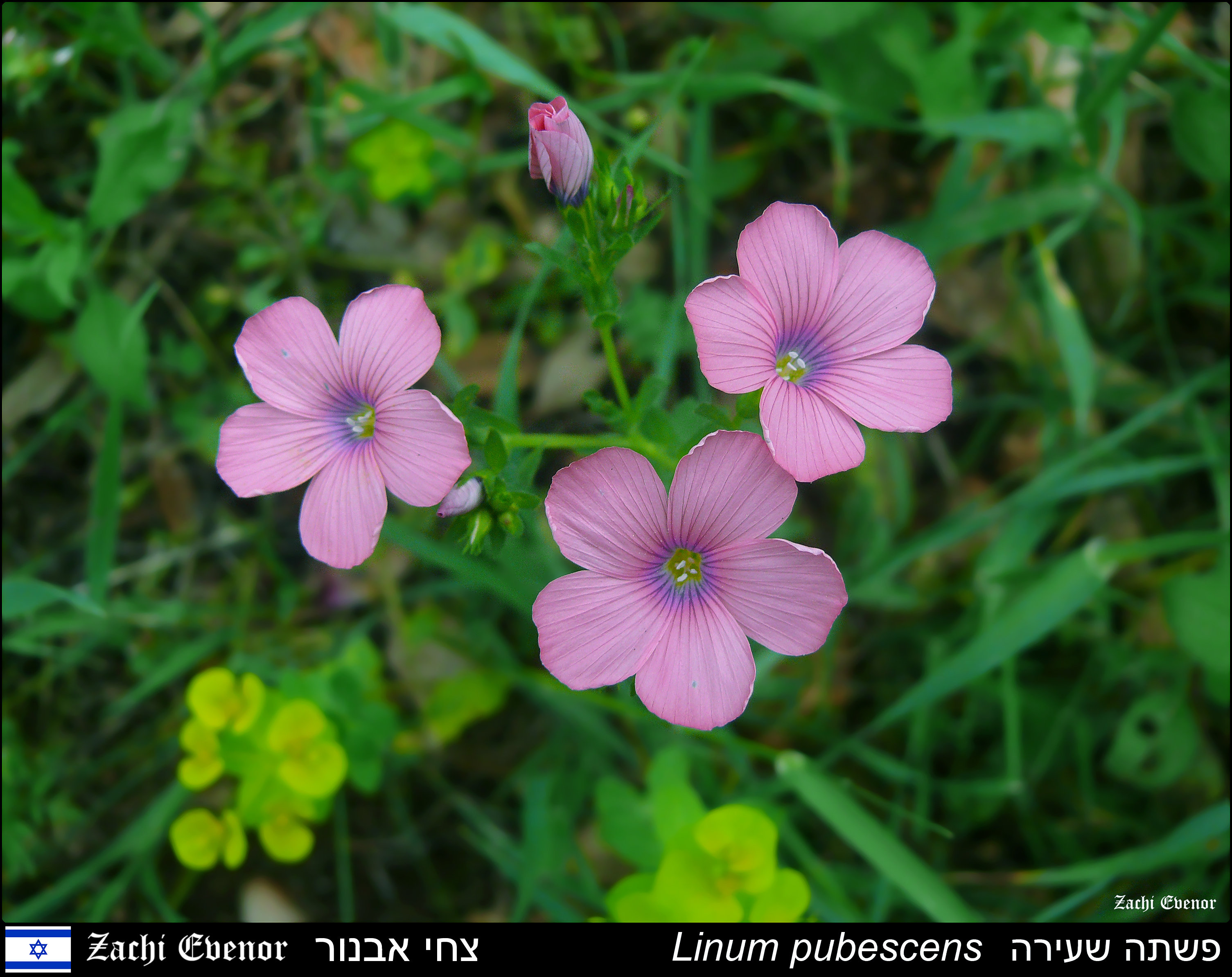
Linum pubescens in Israel with Euphorbia esula

Linum pubescens, the hairy pink flax, is an herbaceous flowering plant in the genus Linum native to the east Mediterranean region. The plant is annual and blooms in the spring.
