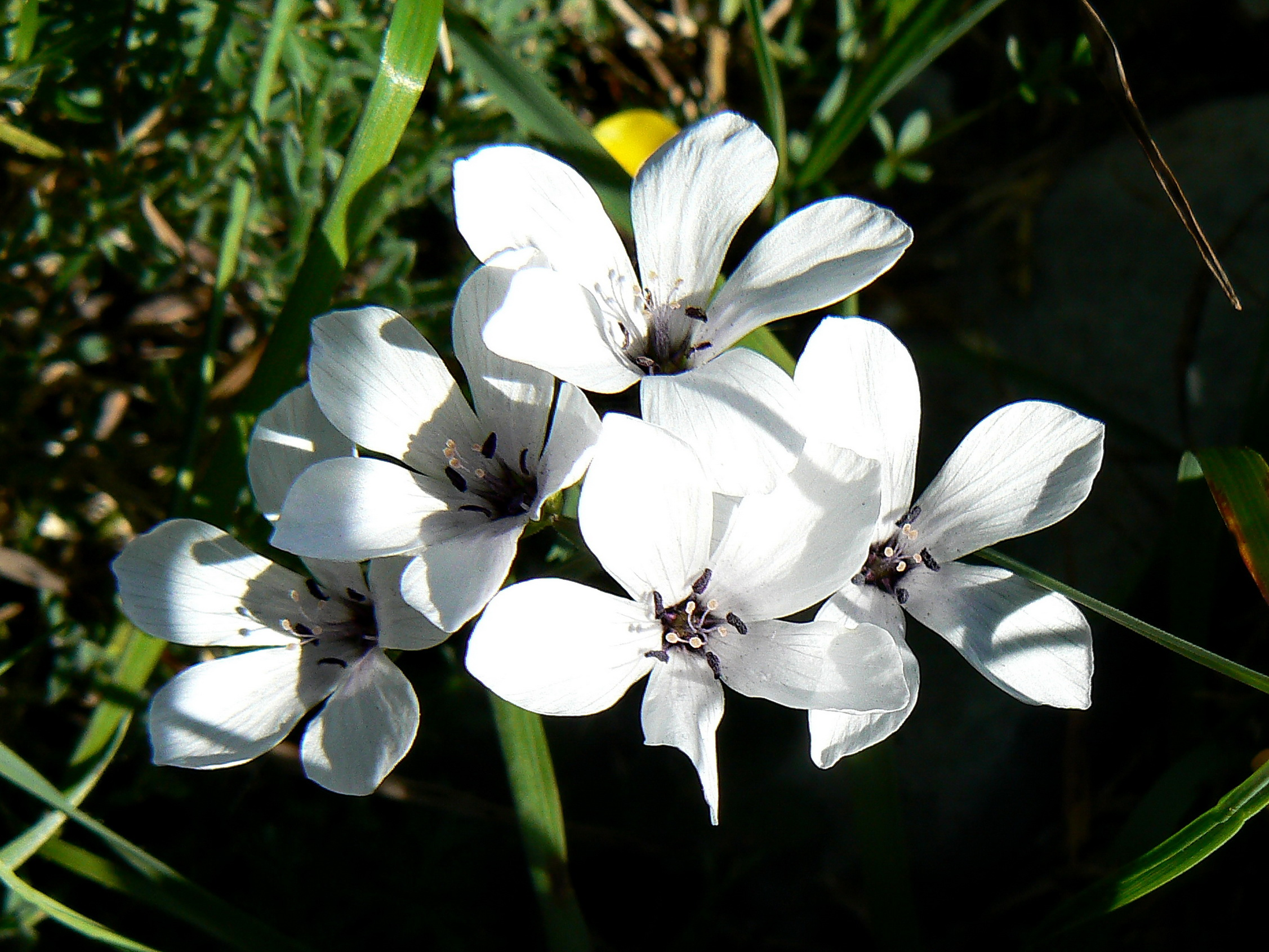
- Flowers
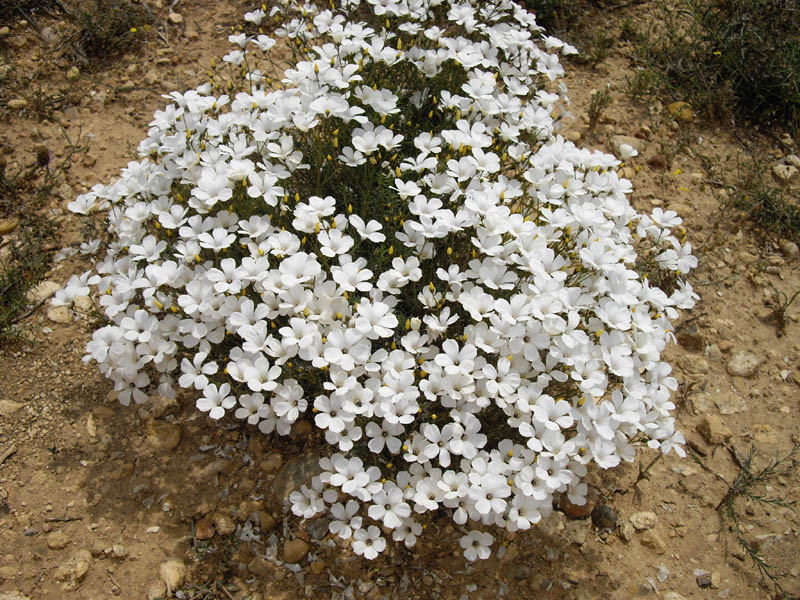
- Habit

Scientific classification
- Kingdom: Plantae
- Clade: Tracheophytes
- Clade: Angiosperms
- Clade: Eudicots
- Clade: Rosids
- Order: Malpighiales
- Family: Linaceae
- Genus: Linum
- Species: L. suffruticosum

Binomial name
- Linum suffruticosum L.

Synonyms
- List: Cathartolinum suffruticosum (L.) Rchb.; Leucolinum suffruticosum (L.) Fourr.; Linum biforme f. suffruticosum (L.) Clavaud; Linum castroviejoi Mart.Labarga, Pedrol & Muñoz Garm.; Linum differens Pau; Linum fruticosum Mill.; Linum salsoloides var. crispum Pers.; Linum suffruticosum var. angustifolium Lange; Linum suffruticosum var. fruticosum Mill. ex Steud.; Linum suffruticosum var. fruticosum Vayr.; Linum tenuifolium Asso; Linum tenuifolium var. differens (Pau) O.Bolòs & Vigo; Linum tenuifolium subsp. suffruticosum (L.) Litard.; Linum tenuifolium var. suffruticosum (L.) O.Bolòs & Vigo

= Linum suffruticosum =

Species of plant

Linum suffruticosum, the white flax or Pyrenean flax, is a species of flowering plant in the family Linaceae, native to Spain. It is a polyploid species complex with significant morphological variation.

== Subtaxa ==
The following subspecies, all native to Spain, are accepted:

- Linum suffruticosum subsp. castroviejoi (Mart.Labarga, Pedrol & Muñoz Garm.) L.Sáez & Aymerich
- Linum suffruticosum subsp. crespoi Mart.Labarga & Muñoz Garm.
- Linum suffruticosum subsp. differens (Pau) Rivas Goday & Rivas Mart.
- Linum suffruticosum subsp. loeflingii Mart.Labarga & Muñoz Garm.
- Linum suffruticosum subsp. montserratii Mart.Labarga & Muñoz Garm.
- Linum suffruticosum subsp. suffruticosum
