= Linum cratericola =

Conservation status
- Critically Endangered (IUCN 2.3)

Scientific classification
- Kingdom: Plantae
- Clade: Tracheophytes
- Clade: Angiosperms
- Clade: Eudicots
- Clade: Rosids
- Order: Malpighiales
- Family: Linaceae
- Genus: Linum
- Species: L. cratericola

Binomial name
- Linum cratericola Eliasson

Species of flowering plant

Linum cratericola, the Floreana Flax, is a species of plant in the Linaceae family. It was first discovered in 1966 by Uno Eliasson. Between 1981 and 1997 it was relatively unseen, but a population of 13 individuals was rediscovered at one of the original locations. It is endemic to the Galápagos Islands of Ecuador, and is critically endangered. Since, the population has recovered to 400, after protection against goats and feral donkeys was created using fences.
