= Linum intercursum =

Scientific classification
- Kingdom: Plantae
- Clade: Tracheophytes
- Clade: Angiosperms
- Clade: Eudicots
- Clade: Rosids
- Order: Malpighiales
- Family: Linaceae
- Genus: Linum
- Species: L. intercursum

Binomial name
- Linum intercursum E.P.Bicknell

Synonyms
- Cathartolinum intercursum

Species of flowering plant

Linum intercursum, common names sandplain flax and sandplain wild flax, is a perennial plant native to the United States.

== Conservation status in the United States ==
It is listed as endangered in Indiana, New Jersey, Pennsylvania, and Rhode Island, as threatened in Maryland and New York, and as a species of special concern in and Massachusetts. It is a species of special concern and believed extirpated in Connecticut.
