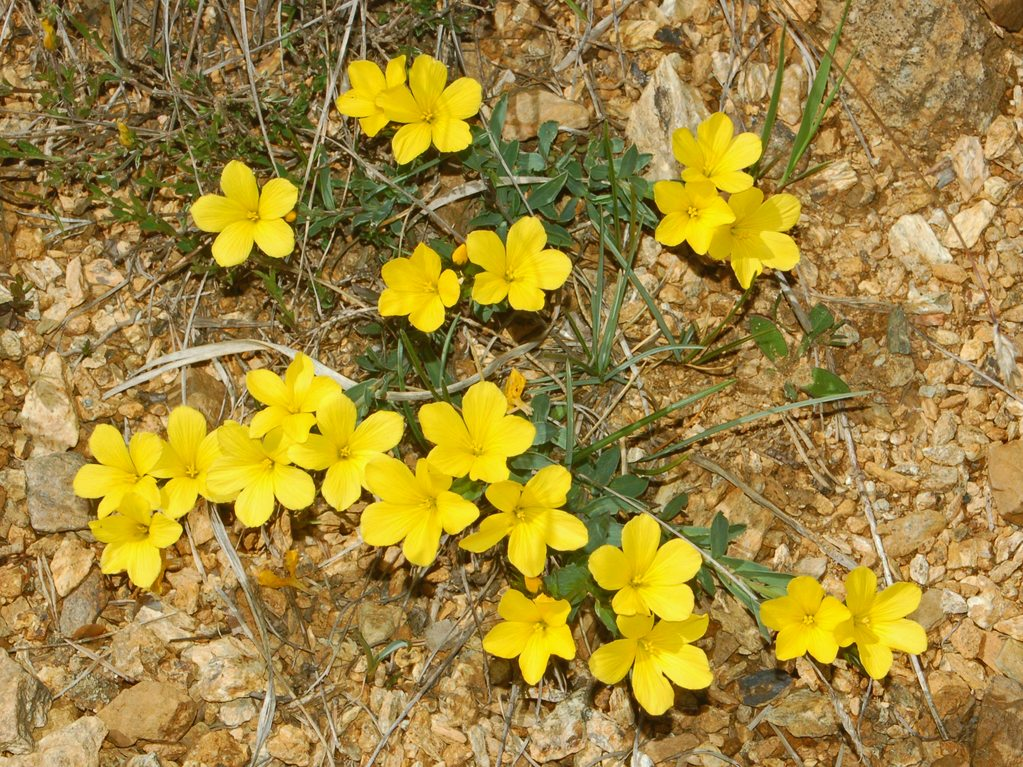

Scientific classification
- Kingdom: Plantae
- Clade: Tracheophytes
- Clade: Angiosperms
- Clade: Eudicots
- Clade: Rosids
- Order: Malpighiales
- Family: Linaceae
- Genus: Linum
- Species: L. campanulatum

Binomial name
- Linum campanulatum L.

Synonyms
- Xantholinum campanulatum (L.) Rchb.

= Linum campanulatum =

Species of flowering plant

Linum campanulatum is a perennial plant belonging to the Linaceae family.

== Description ==
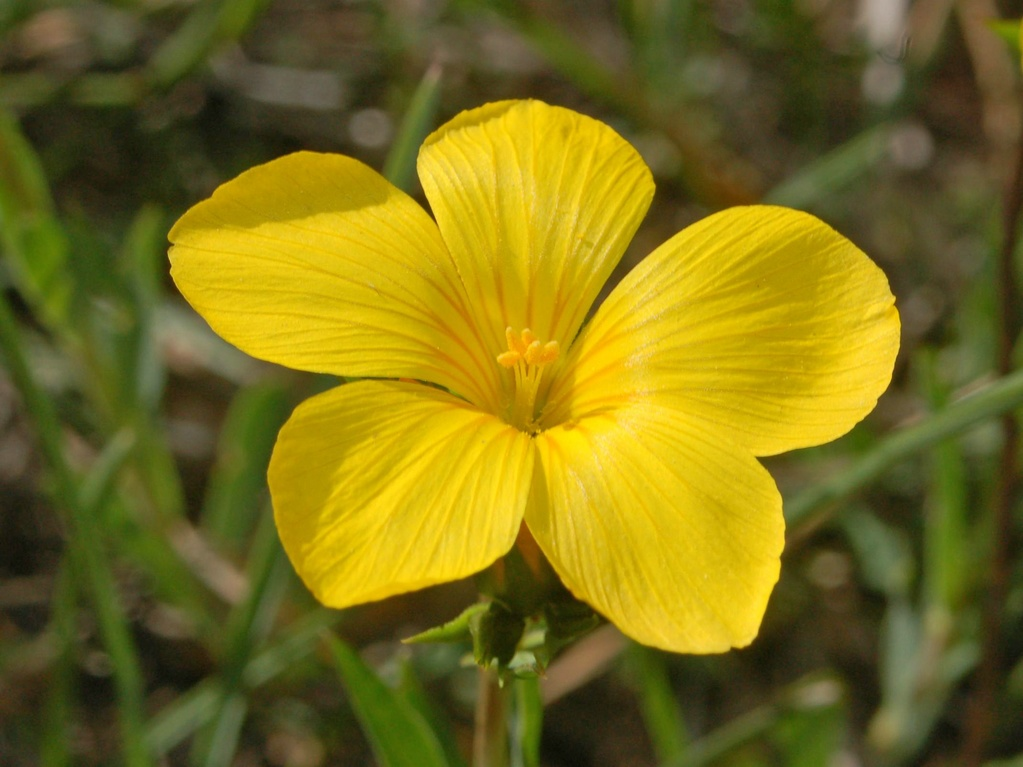
Flower

Linum campanulatum reaches on average 10–30 centimetres (3.9–11.8 in) in height. The short stem is perennial, woody and glabrous, with long herbaceous annual branches. Leaves are alternate, up to 4 cm long and 1 cm wide. The shape of lower cauline leaves is quite variable. Usually they are obovate-obtuse, but in some cases may be spatulate-lanceolate. The upper cauline leaves are gradually reduced in width to become almost linear.

The inflorescence has 3-5 campanulate actinomorphic flowers, about 3 centimetres (1.2 in) in diameter, with five free sepals and five free petals. Petals are yellow, oblong-oval, 2.5-3.5 cm long. The flowering period extends from May through June. The flowers are hermaphrodite and pollinated by insects (entomophily). Fruit is a capsule with ten compartments, each containing one seed.

== Distribution ==
This plant is widespread in the western Mediterranean, from Spain to northwestern Italy.

== Habitat ==
It prefers rocky places containing serpentinites, at an altitude of 300–1,100 metres (980–3,610 ft) above sea level.
