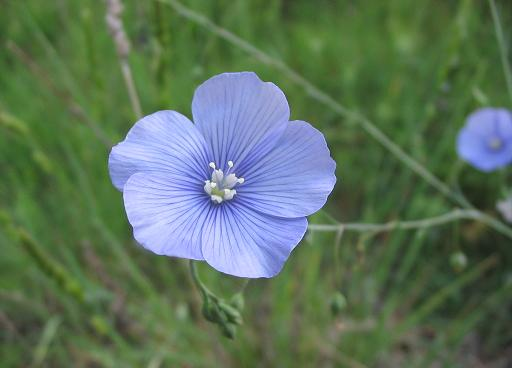

Scientific classification
- Kingdom: Plantae
- Clade: Tracheophytes
- Clade: Angiosperms
- Clade: Eudicots
- Clade: Rosids
- Order: Malpighiales
- Family: Linaceae
- Genus: Linum
- Species: L. narbonense

Binomial name
- Linum narbonense L.

= Linum narbonense =

Species of flowering plant

Linum narbonense, the perennial flax or blue flax, is a flowering plant in the family Linaceae, native to Europe and similar in appearance to Linum perenne.

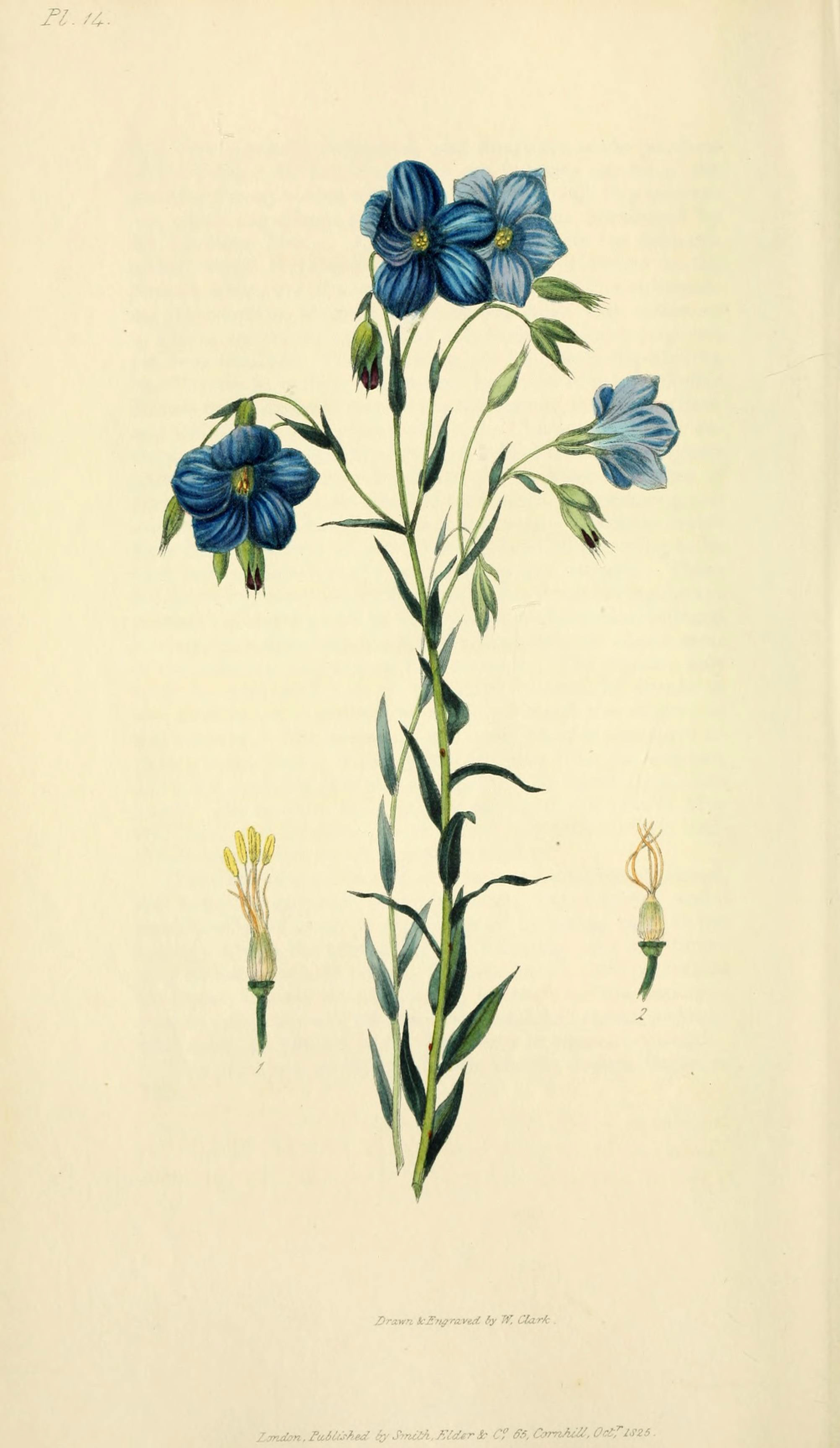
Illustration showing buds and flowers.

Growing to 1–2.5 feet tall and 1 foot wide, the stem terminates in a cyme of about ten clear blue flowers with five petals, 2–2.5 cm in diameter, and the small, narrow grayish green leavesk are arranged on the stem in whorls. In early summer it produces teardrops buds. The seed heads are small beige balls.

== Cultivation ==
Linum narbonense is found cultivated in gardens. Seeds should be started indoors 6–8 weeks before last frost or outdoors in early spring once the soil is workable. Seeds should germinate in 14–30 days.
