= List of Canadian plants by family L =

Main page: List of Canadian plants by family

The following families of vascular plants are listed as occurring in Canada:

For mosses of Canada, see:

== Lamiaceae ==
- Agastache foeniculum — blue giant-hyssop
- Agastache nepetoides — yellow giant-hyssop
- Agastache urticifolia — nettleleaf giant-hyssop
- Blephilia ciliata — downy woodmint
- Blephilia hirsuta — hairy woodmint
- Clinopodium arkansanum — low calamint
- Clinopodium douglasii — Douglas' savoury
- Clinopodium vulgare — field basil
- Collinsonia canadensis — Canada horsebalm
- Dracocephalum parviflorum — American dragonhead
- Hedeoma hispida — rough false pennyroyal
- Hedeoma pulegioides — American false pennyroyal
- Lycopus americanus — American bugleweed
- Lycopus asper — rough bugleweed
- Lycopus laurentianus — St. Lawrence water-horehound
- Lycopus rubellus — taperleaf bugleweed
- Lycopus uniflorus — northern bugleweed
- Lycopus virginicus — Virginia bugleweed
- Lycopus x sherardii
- Mentha arvensis — corn mint
- Mentha canadensis — Canadian mint
- Monarda didyma — Oswego-tea
- Monarda fistulosa — wild bergamot beebalm
- Monarda media — purple bergamot
- Monarda punctata — spotted beebalm
- Monardella odoratissima — mountain wildmint
- Physostegia ledinghamii — Ledingham's physostegia
- Physostegia parviflora — purple dragonhead
- Physostegia virginiana — false dragonhead
- Prunella vulgaris — self-heal
- Pycnanthemum incanum — hoary mountainmint
- Pycnanthemum tenuifolium — slender mountainmint
- Pycnanthemum verticillatum — whorled mountainmint
- Scutellaria angustifolia — narrowleaf skullcap
- Scutellaria galericulata — hooded skullcap
- Scutellaria lateriflora — mad-dog skullcap
- Scutellaria nervosa — veined skullcap
- Scutellaria parvula — small skullcap
- Scutellaria x churchilliana — Churchill's skullcap
- Stachys chamissonis — coastal hedge-nettle
- Stachys mexicana — Mexican hedge-nettle
- Stachys palustris — marsh hedge-nettle
- Stachys pilosa — hairy hedge-nettle
- Stachys tenuifolia — smooth hedge-nettle
- Teucrium canadense — American germander
- Trichostema brachiatum — false pennyroyal
- Trichostema dichotomum — forked bluecurls
- Trichostema oblongum — mountain bluecurls

== Lauraceae ==
- Lindera benzoin — spicebush
- Sassafras albidum — sassafras

== Lejeuneaceae ==
- Cololejeunea biddlecomiae
- Cololejeunea macounii
- Lejeunea alaskana
- Lejeunea cavifolia

== Lemnaceae ==
- Lemna minor — lesser duckweed
- Lemna trisulca — star duckweed
- Lemna turionifera — turion duckweed
- Spirodela polyrrhiza — common water-flaxseed
- Wolffia arrhiza — spotless water-flaxseed
- Wolffia borealis — dotted watermeal
- Wolffia brasiliensis — pointed watermeal
- Wolffia columbiana — Columbian watermeal

== Lentibulariaceae ==
- Pinguicula macroceras — California butterwort
- Pinguicula villosa — hairy butterwort
- Pinguicula vulgaris — common butterwort
- Utricularia cornuta — horned bladderwort
- Utricularia geminiscapa — hidden-fruit bladderwort
- Utricularia gibba — humped bladderwort
- Utricularia intermedia — flatleaf bladderwort
- Utricularia macrorhiza — greater bladderwort
- Utricularia minor — lesser bladderwort
- Utricularia ochroleuca — northern bladderwort
- Utricularia purpurea — purple bladderwort
- Utricularia radiata — small swollen bladderwort
- Utricularia resupinata — northeastern bladderwort
- Utricularia subulata — zigzag bladderwort

== Lepidoziaceae ==
- Bazzania ambigua
- Bazzania denudata — bazzania lichen
- Bazzania pearsonii
- Bazzania tricrenata
- Bazzania trilobata — three-lobed bazzania
- Kurzia pauciflora
- Kurzia setacea
- Kurzia sylvatica
- Lepidozia filamentosa
- Lepidozia reptans
- Lepidozia sandvicensis

== Leptodontaceae ==
- Forsstroemia trichomitria

== Leskeaceae ==
- Bryohaplocladium microphyllum
- Bryohaplocladium virginianum
- Claopodium bolanderi
- Claopodium crispifolium
- Claopodium pellucinerve
- Claopodium whippleanum
- Lescuraea saxicola
- Leskea gracilescens
- Leskea obscura
- Leskea polycarpa
- Leskeella nervosa
- Lindbergia brachyptera — Lindberg's maple-moss
- Pseudoleskea atricha
- Pseudoleskea baileyi
- Pseudoleskea incurvata
- Pseudoleskea julacea
- Pseudoleskea patens
- Pseudoleskea radicosa
- Pseudoleskea stenophylla
- Pseudoleskeella sibirica
- Pseudoleskeella tectorum

== Leucobryaceae ==
- Leucobryum glaucum — pincushion moss

== Leucodontaceae ==
- Alsia californica
- Antitrichia californica
- Antitrichia curtipendula
- Dendroalsia abietina
- Leucodon brachypus
- Leucodon julaceus

== Liliaceae ==
- Aletris farinosa — white-tubed colicroot
- Allium acuminatum — tapertip onion
- Allium amplectens — paper onion
- Allium burdickii — narrowleaf wild leek
- Allium canadense — meadow onion
- Allium cernuum — nodding onion
- Allium crenulatum — Olympic onion
- Allium geyeri — Geyer's onion
- Allium schoenoprasum — wild chives
- Allium stellatum — glade onion
- Allium textile — white wild onion
- Allium tricoccum — small white leek
- Allium validum — tall swamp onion
- Brodiaea coronaria — harvest firecracker-flower
- Calochortus apiculatus — Baker's mariposa lily
- Calochortus lyallii — Lyall's mariposa lily
- Calochortus macrocarpus — greenband mariposa lily
- Camassia leichtlinii — Leichtlin's camassia
- Camassia quamash — common camassia
- Camassia scilloides — wild hyacinth
- Chamaelirium luteum — Devil's-bit
- Clintonia borealis — blue bead-lily
- Clintonia uniflora — single-flowered clintonia
- Erythronium albidum — white trout-lily
- Erythronium americanum — yellow trout-lily
- Erythronium grandiflorum — largeflower yellow fawnlily
- Erythronium montanum — glacier fawnlily
- Erythronium oregonum — giant fawnlily
- Erythronium revolutum — pink fawnlily
- Fritillaria affinis — Ojai fritillary
- Fritillaria camschatcensis — Indian rice
- Fritillaria pudica — yellow mission-bells
- Gagea serotina (syn. Lloydia serotina) — common alpine-lily
- Hypoxis hirsuta — eastern yellow stargrass
- Lilium canadense — Canada lily
- Lilium columbianum — Columbian lily
- Lilium michiganense — Michigan lily
- Lilium philadelphicum — wood lily
- Lophiola aurea — golden crest
- Maianthemum canadense — wild lily-of-the-valley
- Maianthemum dilatatum — false lily-of-the-valley
- Maianthemum racemosum — Solomon's-plume
- Maianthemum stellatum — starflowered Solomon's-plume
- Maianthemum trifolium — three-leaf Solomon's-plume
- Medeola virginiana — Indian cucumber-root
- Nothoscordum bivalve — crow-poison
- Polygonatum biflorum — common Solomon's-seal
- Polygonatum pubescens — downy Solomon's-seal
- Prosartes hookeri — Hooker's mandarin
- Prosartes lanuginosa — yellow mandarin
- Prosartes smithii — Smith's fairy-bells
- Prosartes trachycarpa — rough-fruited mandarin
- Stenanthium occidentale — western featherbells
- Streptopus amplexifolius — clasping twisted-stalk
- Streptopus lanceolatus — rosy twisted-stalk
- Streptopus streptopoides — small twisted-stalk
- Streptopus x oreopolus — hybrid twisted-stalk
- Tofieldia coccinea — northern false-asphodel
- Tofieldia pusilla — Scotch false-asphodel
- Triantha glutinosa — sticky bog-asphodel
- Triantha occidentalis — western false-asphodel
- Trillium cernuum — nodding trillium
- Trillium erectum — ill-scent trillium
- Trillium flexipes — nodding trillium
- Trillium grandiflorum — white trillium
- Trillium ovatum — western trillium
- Trillium undulatum — painted trillium
- Triteleia grandiflora — largeflower triteleia
- Triteleia hyacinthina — white triteleia
- Uvularia grandiflora — largeflower bellwort
- Uvularia perfoliata — perfoliate bellwort
- Uvularia sessilifolia — sessile-leaf bellwort
- Veratrum viride — American false hellebore
- Xerophyllum tenax — western turkeybeard
- Zigadenus elegans — white camas
- Zigadenus venenosus — meadow deathcamas

== Limnanthaceae ==
- Floerkea proserpinacoides — false mermaidweed
- Limnanthes macounii — Macoun's meadowfoam

== Linaceae ==
- Linum australe — southern flax
- Linum compactum — Wyoming flax
- Linum lewisii — prairie flax
- Linum medium — stiff yellow flax
- Linum rigidum — stiff-stem flax
- Linum striatum — ridged yellow flax
- Linum sulcatum — grooved yellow flax
- Linum virginianum — Virginia flax

== Loasaceae ==
- Mentzelia albicaulis — whitestem stickleaf
- Mentzelia decapetala — ten-petal stickleaf
- Mentzelia dispersa — Mada stickleaf
- Mentzelia laevicaulis — giant blazingstar
- Mentzelia veatchiana — Veatch's blazingstar

== Lophocoleaceae ==
- Chiloscyphus pallescens
- Chiloscyphus polyanthos
- Lophocolea bidentata
- Lophocolea heterophylla
- Lophocolea minor

== Lycopodiaceae ==
- Diphasiastrum alpinum — alpine clubmoss
- Diphasiastrum complanatum — trailing clubmoss
- Diphasiastrum digitatum — fan clubmoss
- Diphasiastrum sabinifolium — ground-fir
- Diphasiastrum sitchense — Alaskan clubmoss
- Diphasiastrum tristachyum — deeproot clubmoss
- Diphasiastrum x habereri
- Diphasiastrum x zeilleri
- Huperzia appressa — Appalachian fir-clubmoss
- Huperzia chinensis — Chinese clubmoss
- Huperzia haleakalae — Haleakalā fir-clubmoss
- Huperzia lucidula — shining clubmoss
- Huperzia occidentalis — western shining clubmoss
- Huperzia porophila — rock clubmoss
- Huperzia selago — fir clubmoss
- Huperzia x buttersii — Butters' clubmoss
- Lycopodiella appressa — southern bog clubmoss
- Lycopodiella inundata — bog clubmoss
- Lycopodium annotinum — stiff clubmoss
- Lycopodium clavatum — running-pine
- Lycopodium dendroideum — treelike clubmoss
- Lycopodium hickeyi — Hickey's clubmoss
- Lycopodium lagopus — one-cone ground-pine
- Lycopodium obscurum — tree clubmoss

== Lythraceae ==
- Ammannia robusta — grand redstem
- Decodon verticillatus — hairy swamp loosestrife
- Lythrum alatum — winged loosestrife
- Rotala ramosior — toothcup
