= List of Linum species =

The following species in the flowering plant genus Linum, the flaxes, are accepted by Plants of the World Online. There has been no review of Linum taxonomy since 1931.

- Linum acuticarpum C.M.Rogers
- Linum adenophyllum A.Gray
- Linum adustum E.Mey. ex Planch.
- Linum aethiopicum Thunb.
- Linum africanum L.
- Linum aksehirense Tugay & Ulukus
- Linum alatum (Small) H.J.P.Winkl.
- Linum albidum Ewart & Jean White
- Linum album Kotschy ex Boiss.
- Linum allredii Sivinski & M.O.Howard
- Linum alpinum Jacq.
- Linum altaicum Ledeb. ex Juz.
- Linum amurense Alef.
- Linum anglicum Mill.
- Linum appressum Caball.
- Linum arboreum L.
- Linum arenicola (Small) H.J.P.Winkl.
- Linum aretioides Boiss.
- Linum aristatum Engelm.
- Linum aroanium Boiss. & Orph.
- Linum australe A.Heller
- Linum austriacum L.
- Linum ayliniae Yilmaz
- Linum bahamense Northr.
- Linum baicalense Juz.
- Linum basarabicum (Savul. & Rayss) Klokov ex Juz.
- Linum berlandieri Hook.
- Linum betsiliense Baker
- Linum bicarpellatum Sharsm.
- Linum bienne Mill.
- Linum boissieri Asch. & Sint. ex Boiss.
- Linum brachypetalum O.Schwartz
- Linum brevifolium A.St.-Hil. & Naudin
- Linum brevistylum C.M.Rogers
- Linum breweri A.Gray
- Linum burkartii Mildner
- Linum caespitosum Sm.
- Linum californicum Benth.
- Linum campanulatum L.
- Linum capitatum Kit. ex Schult.
- Linum cariense Boiss.
- Linum carneum A.St.-Hil.
- Linum carnosulum Boiss.
- Linum carratracense (Rivas Goday & Rivas Mart.) Mart.Labarga & Muñoz Garm.
- Linum carteri Small
- Linum catharticum L.
- Linum chaborasicum Mouterde
- Linum chamissonis Schiede
- Linum ciliatum Hayek
- Linum clevelandii Greene
- Linum compactum A.Nelson
- Linum comptonii C.M.Rogers
- Linum congestum A.Gray
- Linum corymbiferum Desf.
- Linum corymbulosum Rchb.
- Linum cratericola Eliasson
- Linum cremnophilum I.M.Johnst.
- Linum cruciatum Planch.
- Linum cubense Bisse
- Linum czernjajevii Klokov
- Linum decumbens Desf.
- Linum densiflorum P.H.Davis
- Linum digynum A.Gray
- Linum doerfleri Rech.f.
- Linum dolomiticum Borbás
- Linum drymarioides Curran
- Linum elegans Spruner ex Boiss.
- Linum elongatum H.J.P.Winkl.
- Linum emirnense Bojer
- Linum empetrifolium (Boiss.) P.H.Davis
- Linum erigeroides A.St.-Hil.
- Linum ertugrulii Tugay, Bagci & Uysal
- Linum esterhuyseniae C.M.Rogers
- Linum euboeum Bornm.
- Linum extraaxillare Kit.
- Linum filiforme Urb.
- Linum flagellare (Small) H.J.P.Winkl.
- Linum flavum L.
- Linum floridanum (Planch.) Trel.
- Linum flos-carmini Ruiz-Martin, Mart.Labarga, Jim.Mejías & Pérez-Barr.
- Linum gaditanum Mart.Labarga & Muñoz Garm.
- Linum goulimyi Rech.f.
- Linum gracile Sm. ex Planch.
- Linum grandiflorum Desf.
- Linum guatemalense Benth.
- Linum gyaricum Vierh.
- Linum gypsogenium G.L.Nesom
- Linum harlingii Eliasson
- Linum harperi Small
- Linum hellenicum Iatroú
- Linum heterosepalum Regel
- Linum heterostylum C.M.Rogers
- Linum hirsutum L.
- Linum hologynum Rchb.
- Linum hudsonioides Planch.
- Linum hypericifolium Salisb.
- Linum imbricatum (Raf.) B.D.Jacks.
- Linum intercursum E.P.Bicknell
- Linum iranicum Hausskn. ex Bornm.
- Linum jimenezii Pau
- Linum katiae Peruzzi
- Linum kaynakiae Yilmaz
- Linum keniense T.C.E.Fr.
- Linum khorassanicum Joharchi & Behrooz.
- Linum kingii S.Watson
- Linum komarovii Juz.
- Linum kurdicum (P.H.Davis) Naum.-Svetl.
- Linum lasiocarpum Rose
- Linum leonii F.W.Schultz
- Linum leucanthum Boiss. & Spruner
- Linum lewisii Pursh
- Linum littorale A.St.-Hil.
- Linum longipes Rose
- Linum lundellii C.M.Rogers
- Linum macraei Benth.
- Linum macrocarpum C.M.Rogers
- Linum macrorhizum Juz.
- Linum marginale A.Cunn.
- Linum marianorum (Rivas Goday & Bellot) Mart.Labarga & Muñoz Garm.
- Linum maritimum L.
- Linum marojejyense (Humbert) C.M.Rogers
- Linum mauritanicum Pomel
- Linum mcvaughii C.M.Rogers
- Linum medium (Planch.) Britton
- Linum meletonis Hand.-Mazz.
- Linum mexicanum Kunth
- Linum micranthum A.Gray
- Linum modestum C.M.Rogers
- Linum monogynum G.Forst.
- Linum mucronatum Bertol.
- Linum mysorense B.Heyne ex Benth.
- Linum narbonense L.
- Linum nelsonii Rose
- Linum neomexicanum Greene
- Linum nervosum Waldst. & Kit.
- Linum nodiflorum L.
- Linum numidicum Murb.
- Linum obtusatum (Boiss.) Stapf
- Linum olgae Juz.
- Linum oligophyllum Willd. ex Schult.
- Linum olympicum Boiss.
- Linum orizabae Planch.
- Linum pallasianum Schult.
- Linum pallescens Bunge
- Linum pamphylicum (Boiss.) Podp.
- Linum perenne L.
- Linum persicum Boiss.
- Linum peyronii Post
- Linum phitosianum Christod. & Iatroú
- Linum platyphyllum (P.H.Davis) Yild.
- Linum polygaloides Planch.
- Linum pratense (Norton) Small
- Linum pringlei S.Watson
- Linum prostratum Dombey ex Lam.
- Linum puberulum (Engelm.) A.Heller
- Linum pubescens Banks & Sol.
- Linum punctatum C.Presl
- Linum pungens Planch.
- Linum quadrifolium L.
- Linum ramosissimum Gay
- Linum rigidum Pursh
- Linum rupestre Engelm. ex A.Gray
- Linum rzedowskii Arreguín
- Linum salsoloides Lam.
- Linum scabrellum Planch.
- Linum schiedeanum Schltdl. & Cham.
- Linum scoparium Griseb.
- Linum selaginoides Lam.
- Linum seljukorum P.H.Davis
- Linum setaceum Brot.
- Linum silpii Gomb.
- Linum smithii Mildner
- Linum spergulinum A.Gray
- Linum squamulosum Rudolphi ex Willd.
- Linum squarrosum Munby
- Linum stelleroides Planch.
- Linum stocksianum Boiss.
- Linum striatum Walter
- Linum strictum L.
- Linum subbiflorum Juz.
- Linum subteres (Trel.) H.J.P.Winkl.
- Linum suffruticosum L.
- Linum sulcatum Riddell
- Linum tauricum Willd.
- Linum tegedense (C.Vicioso ex Pau) Mart.Labarga & Muñoz Garm.
- Linum tenellum Schltdl. & Cham.
- Linum tenue Desf.
- Linum tenuifolium L.
- Linum thesioides Bartl.
- Linum thracicum Degen
- Linum thunbergii Eckl. & Zeyh.
- Linum tmoleum Boiss.
- Linum toxicum Boiss.
- Linum triflorum P.H.Davis
- Linum trigynum L.
- Linum turcomanicum Juz.
- Linum ucranicum (Griseb. ex Planch.) Czern.
- Linum unguiculatum P.H.Davis
- Linum uninerve (Rochel) Jáv.
- Linum usitatissimum L.
- Linum vanense Azn.
- Linum velutinum Steud. ex Planch.
- Linum vernale Wooton
- Linum verruciferum Azn.
- Linum villarianum Pau
- Linum villosum C.M.Rogers
- Linum violascens Bunge
- Linum virginianum L.
- Linum virgultorum Boiss. & Heldr. ex Planch.
- Linum viscosum L.
- Linum volkensii Engl.
- Linum vuralianum Yilmaz & Kaynak
- Linum westii C.M.Rogers
