= Allium reticulatum =

Allium reticulatum is a botanical synonym of five species of plant:

- Allium amplectens, synonym published in 1857 by George Bentham
- Allium angulosum, synonym published in 1822 by Karl Friedrich Wilhelm Wallroth
- Allium strictum, synonym published in 1819 by Jan Svatopluk Presl & Carl Borivoj Presl
- Allium textile, synonym published in 1827 by George Don
- Allium victorialis, synonym published in 1880 by Jean Baptiste Saint-Lager
