= Yellow flax =

Yellow flax is a common name for several plants in the flax family (Linaceae) and may refer to:

- Linum flavum, native to central and southern Europe
- Linum sulcatum, grooved yellow flax, native to eastern North America
- Reinwardtia indica, native to the Himalayas
