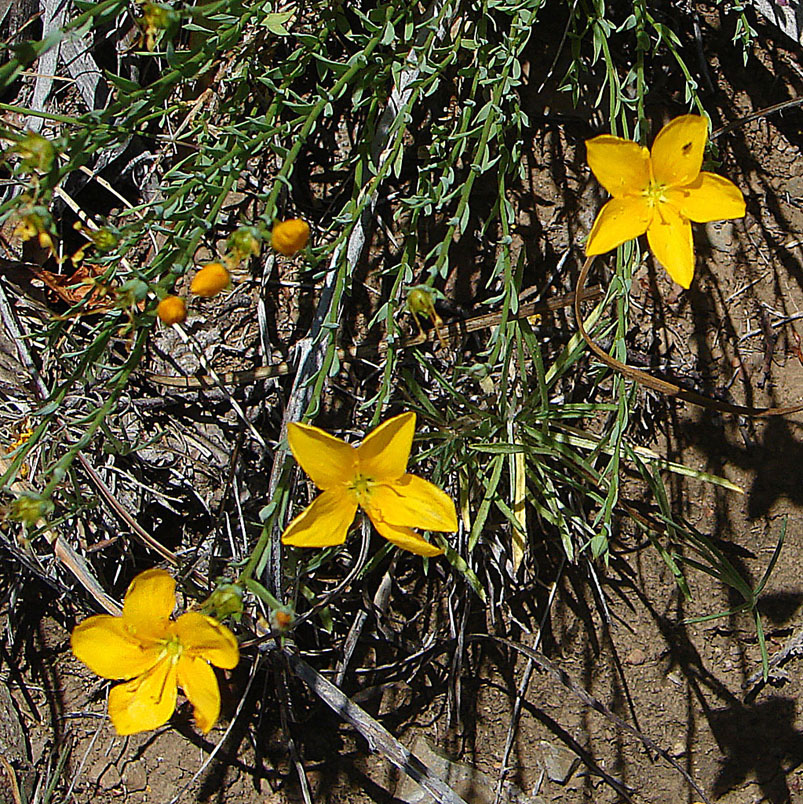

Scientific classification
- Kingdom: Plantae
- Clade: Tracheophytes
- Clade: Angiosperms
- Clade: Eudicots
- Clade: Rosids
- Order: Malpighiales
- Family: Linaceae
- Genus: Linum
- Species: L. chamissonis

Binomial name
- Linum chamissonis Schiede

= Linum chamissonis =

Species of plant

Linum chamissonis is a species of flowering plant in the family Linaceae. It is one of the four species of Linum that are endemic to Chile, alongside Linum cremnophilum, Linum macraei and Linum ramosissimum. It is distributed from the Maule to the Araucania regions.
