= Golden flax =

Golden flax is a common name for several plants in the flax family (Linaceae), and may refer to:

- Flax, the golden colored seeds produced by some forms of the widely cultivated blue-flowered flax species, Linum usitatissimum
- Linum flavum, a species native to Europe, with golden flowers
