= Fluxweed =

Fluxweed is a common name for several plants and may refer to:

- Descurainia sophia, a member of the family Brassicaceae
- Trichostema brachiatum, a plant endemic to North America
