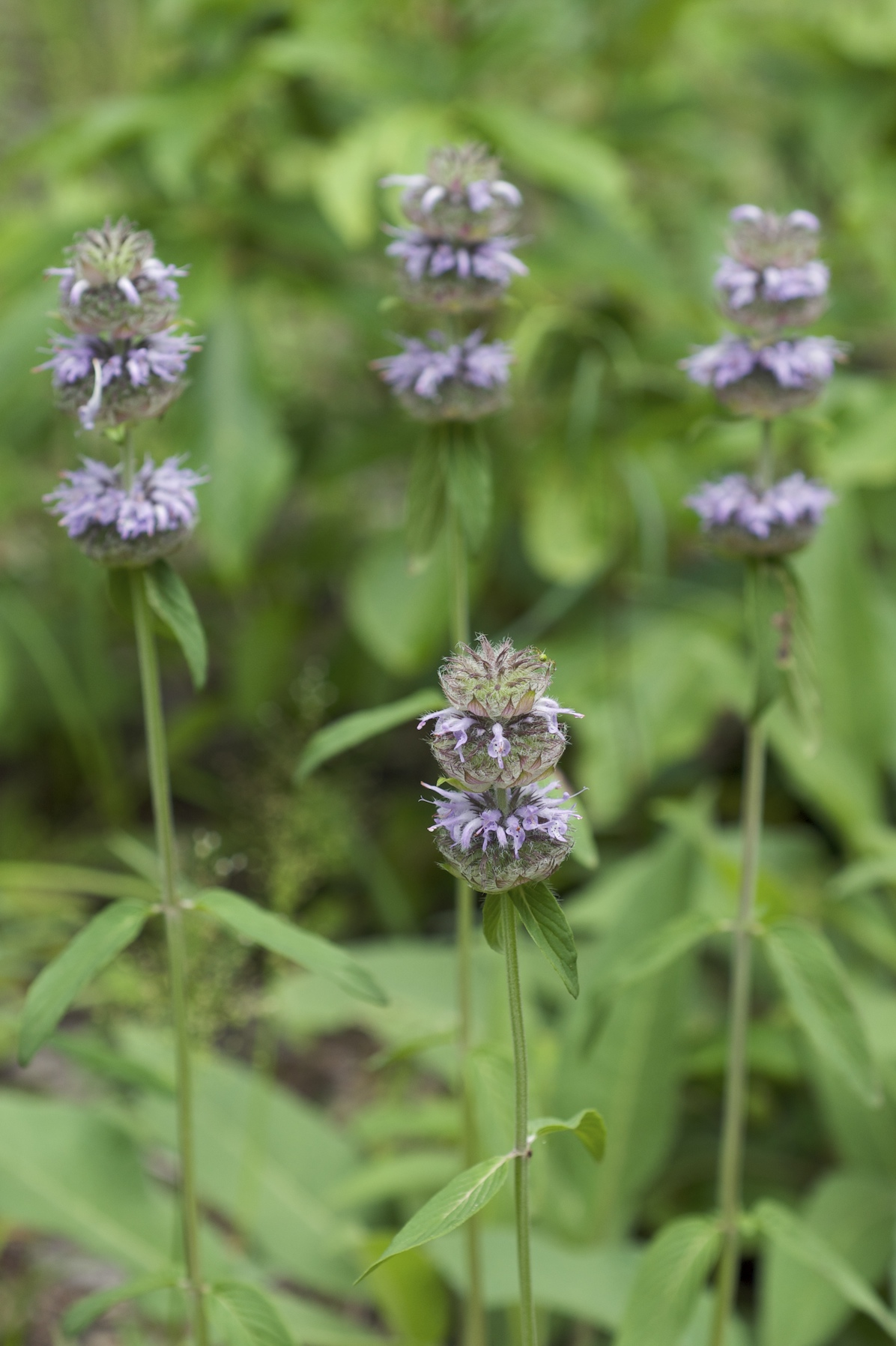
- Downy pagoda-plant (Blephilia ciliata)

Scientific classification
- Kingdom: Plantae
- Clade: Tracheophytes
- Clade: Angiosperms
- Clade: Eudicots
- Clade: Asterids
- Order: Lamiales
- Family: Lamiaceae
- Subfamily: Nepetoideae
- Tribe: Mentheae
- Genus: Blephilia (L.) Raf.

= Blephilia =

Genus of flowering plants

Blephilia, the pagoda plant or wood mint, is a genus of four species of flowering plants in the family Lamiaceae. They are all herbaceous plants native to eastern North America. Blephilia are most often found in open areas, glades, and mesic forests. All species of Blephilia are considered threatened or endangered in some states.

The genus includes only perennial species that spread by both seeds and through stem division. Small white to purple-lavender flowers occur in inflorescences that cluster in the upper leaf axils, often in several circular layers (hence the common name pagoda-plant). Leaves are generally lanceolate to ovate and vary in shades of green. Leaves are either petiolate or subsessile (depending on the species). Like many other members of the subtribe Menthinae, all parts of Blephilia are highly aromatic when crushed and have smells similar to menthol and spearmint.

== Species ==
- Blephilia ciliata (L.) Benth. – downy pagoda-plant – widespread from Texas and Florida north to Quebec and Ontario
- Blephilia hirsuta (Pursh) Benth. – hairy pagoda-plant – widespread from Texas and Georgia north to Quebec and Ontario
- Blephilia subnuda Simmers & Kral – Cumberland pagoda-plant – endemic to northeastern Alabama and southern Tennessee
- Blephilia woffordii Floden - Wofford's pagoda-plant - endemic to central Tennessee
