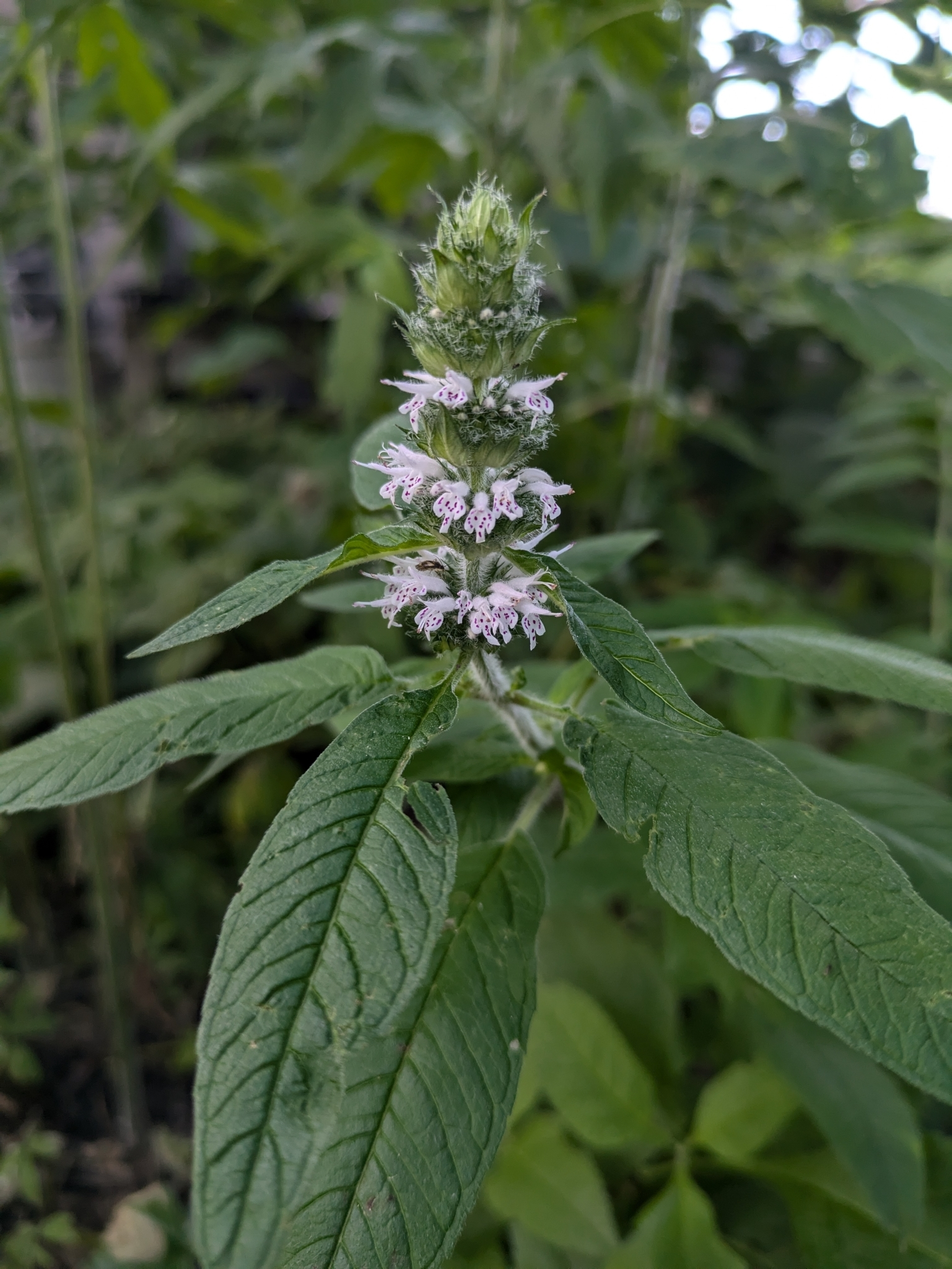

Conservation status
- Secure (NatureServe)

Scientific classification
- Kingdom: Plantae
- Clade: Tracheophytes
- Clade: Angiosperms
- Clade: Eudicots
- Clade: Asterids
- Order: Lamiales
- Family: Lamiaceae
- Genus: Blephilia
- Species: B. hirsuta

Binomial name
- Blephilia hirsuta (Pursh) Benth.

Varieties
- B. hirsuta var. glabrata; B. hirsuta var. hirsuta

Synonyms
- Monarda hirsuta Pursh

= Blephilia hirsuta =

Species of flowering plant

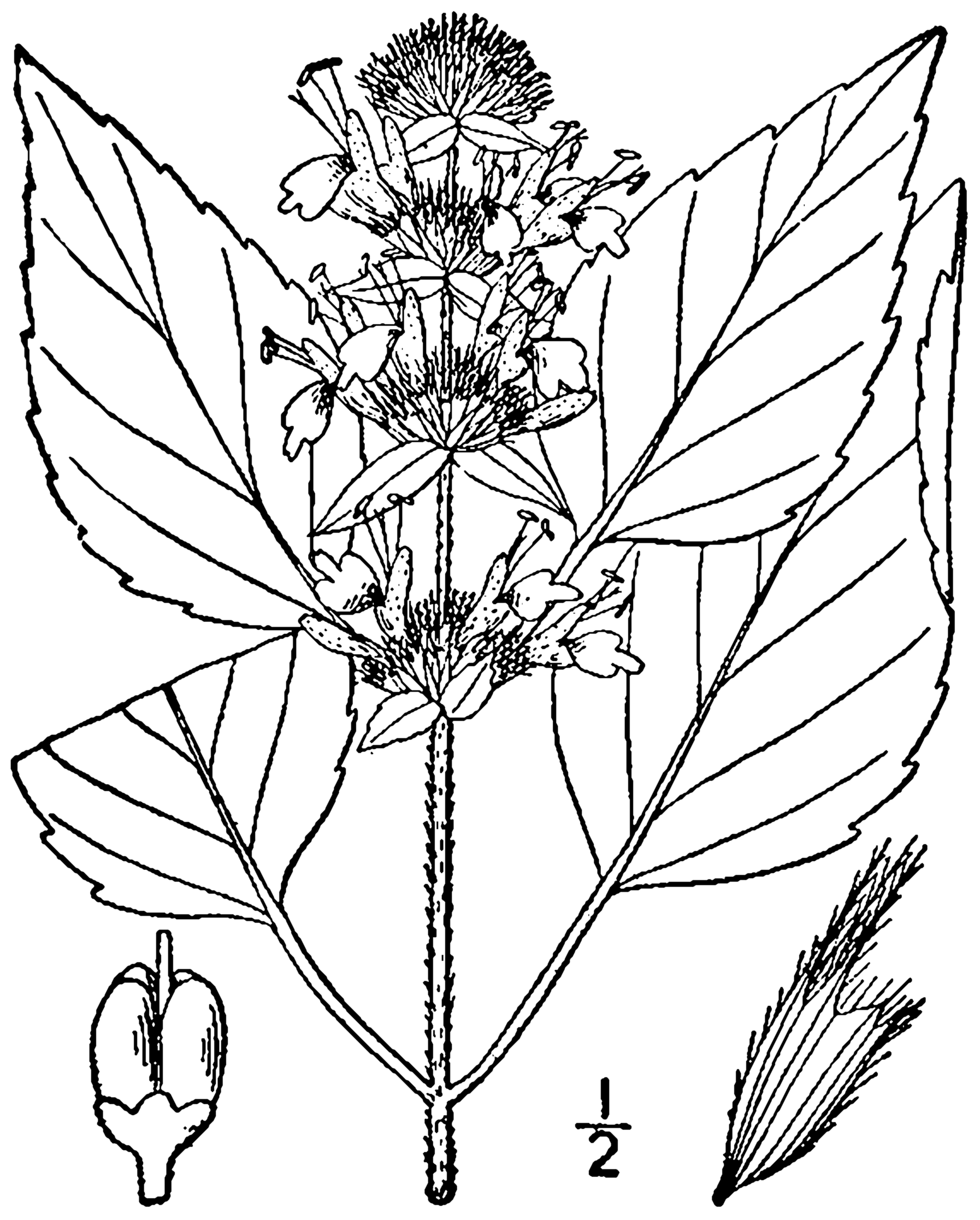
B. hirsuta illustration

Blephilia hirsuta, commonly known as hairy wood-mint or hairy pagoda plant, is a species of herbaceous perennial in the mint family Lamiaceae. It is native to eastern North America.

== Description ==
Hairy wood mint is a perennial plant that is normally 30 to 120 cm (12 to 47 in) tall. The central stem is covered with long white hairs and ends in several whorls of flowers.

The flowers can be either light blue, pale purple or white with purple spots. Each flower is about 1 cm (1/2 in) long with light green sepals, two main 'lips', two visible stamens, and a style that is divided at its tip. The flowers appear in the summer for roughly a month and a half.

Arranged oppositely along the stem, the leaves of hairy wood mint are long but thin, becoming wider near the base of the leaf. They are pleasantly fragrant. The petioles are 1 to 3 cm (1/2 to 1 1/4 inches) and are covered with little hairs. Out of all the plants in this genus, Blephilia hirsuta has the largest leaves. The stems grow from a system of rhizomes with fibrous roots.

== Taxonomy ==
The German-American botanist Frederick Pursh described the hairy wood mint as Monarda hirsuta in his 1814 work Flora americae septentrionalis, before George Bentham gave it its current binomial name.

== Distribution and habitat ==
In Canada, hairy wood mint can be found in southern Quebec and Ontario. It is common throughout the eastern United States, including Connecticut, Florida, Indiana, Kentucky, Minnesota, Nebraska, North Carolina, Tennessee, West Virginia, and Wisconsin.

Hairy wood mint prefers rich moist soil in hardwood forests, along streams and rivers, in forest openings and thickets underlain by limestone, and is occasionally found near wetlands. Hairy wood mint likes partial sun or light shade. Forests with infrequent, low-intensity disturbances (i.e., gap dynamics) are ideal.

== Importance to humans ==
Hairy wood mint is not generally used as food by humans, but it is often planted in gardens for its beauty and pleasant aroma; when the leaves are crushed or damaged they give off a minty scent. It may, however, have some beneficial medicinal properties, given that a related species (Blephilia ciliata) has historically been used by the Cherokee as a poultice to treat headaches.

== Ecology ==
Many different types of bees (e.g., honeybees, mason bees, and miner bees), flies (e.g., bee-flies and syrphids), and butterflies (e.g., skippers) pollinate the flowers of hairy wood mint. Many of these pollinators pollinate the hairy wood mint because they get a nectar reward, although some are after the pollen itself. The foliage "probably isn't attractive to mammalian herbivores as a food source."

== Conservation ==
Over most of its range Blephilia hirsuta is a secure species, but in Connecticut it is listed as a species of 'special concern', in Vermont it is 'threatened', and in Massachusetts hairy wood-mint is an endangered species. Unfortunately, the exact needs for conservation management are not known.
