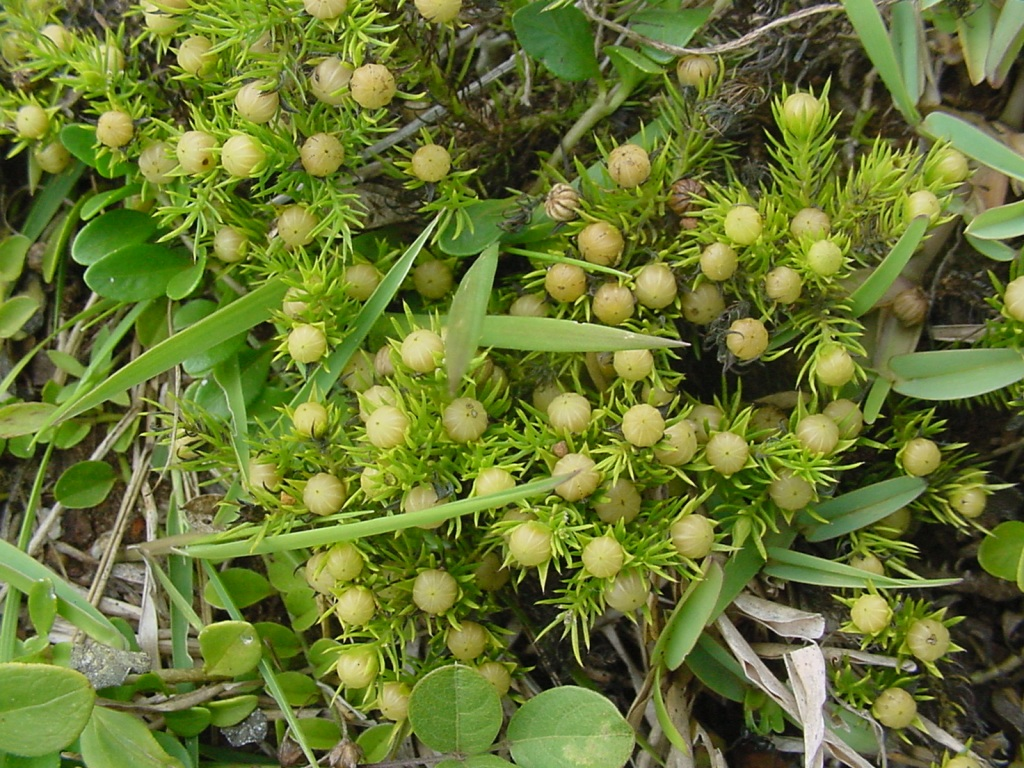

Scientific classification
- Kingdom: Plantae
- Clade: Tracheophytes
- Clade: Angiosperms
- Clade: Eudicots
- Clade: Rosids
- Order: Malpighiales
- Family: Linaceae
- Genus: Linum
- Species: L. selaginoides

Binomial name
- Linum selaginoides Lam.

= Linum selaginoides =

Species of plant

Linum selaginoides is a species of flowering plant in the family Linaceae. It is a perennial herb native to South America. In Chile, it is locally known as merulahuén and it is distributed from the Valparaiso to the Los Rios regions.
