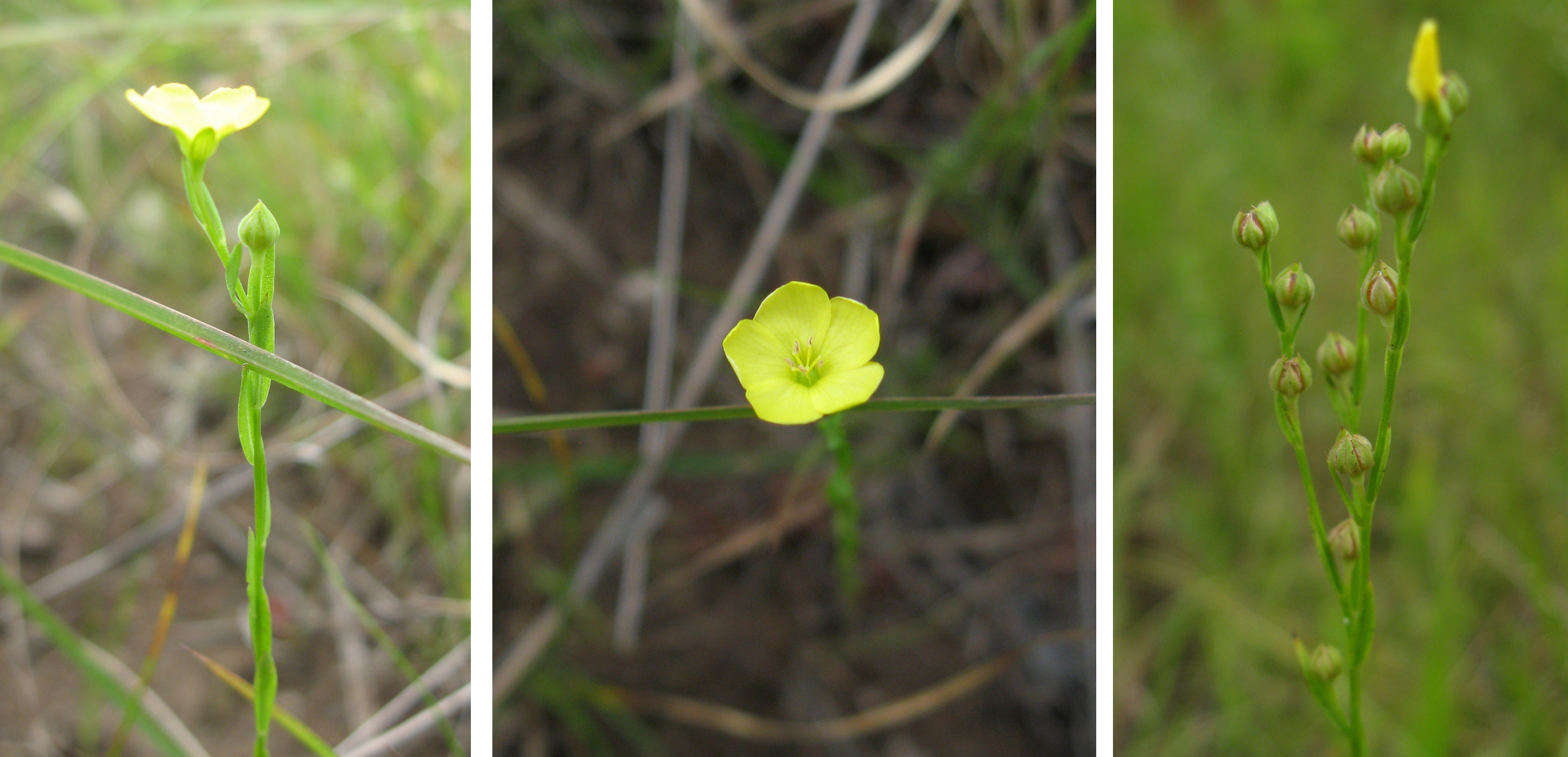

Scientific classification
- Kingdom: Plantae
- Clade: Tracheophytes
- Clade: Angiosperms
- Clade: Eudicots
- Clade: Rosids
- Order: Malpighiales
- Family: Linaceae
- Genus: Linum
- Species: L. medium

Binomial name
- Linum medium (Planch.) Britton

= Linum medium =

Species of flowering plant

Linum medium, common name stiff yellow flax, is a species of Linum (flax) native to eastern North America. It is found as far west as Texas and Wisconsin, east to the Atlantic Ocean, north to Ontario and Maine, and south to southern Florida. It is also found in The Bahamas.

Its natural habitat is open areas such as prairies and savannas, often on acidic soil. It is a conservative species, usually restricted to high-quality natural communities.

Linum medium is a perennial that produces flowers in mid-summer. It is one of several yellow-flowered Linum species that are widespread in eastern North America; others include L. floridanum, L. striatum, L. sulcatum, and L. virginianum.

== Taxonomy ==
The species has two varieties:

- Linum medium var. medium - Limited to around the Great Lakes
- Linum medium var. texanum - Widely distributed across eastern North America and The Bahamas
