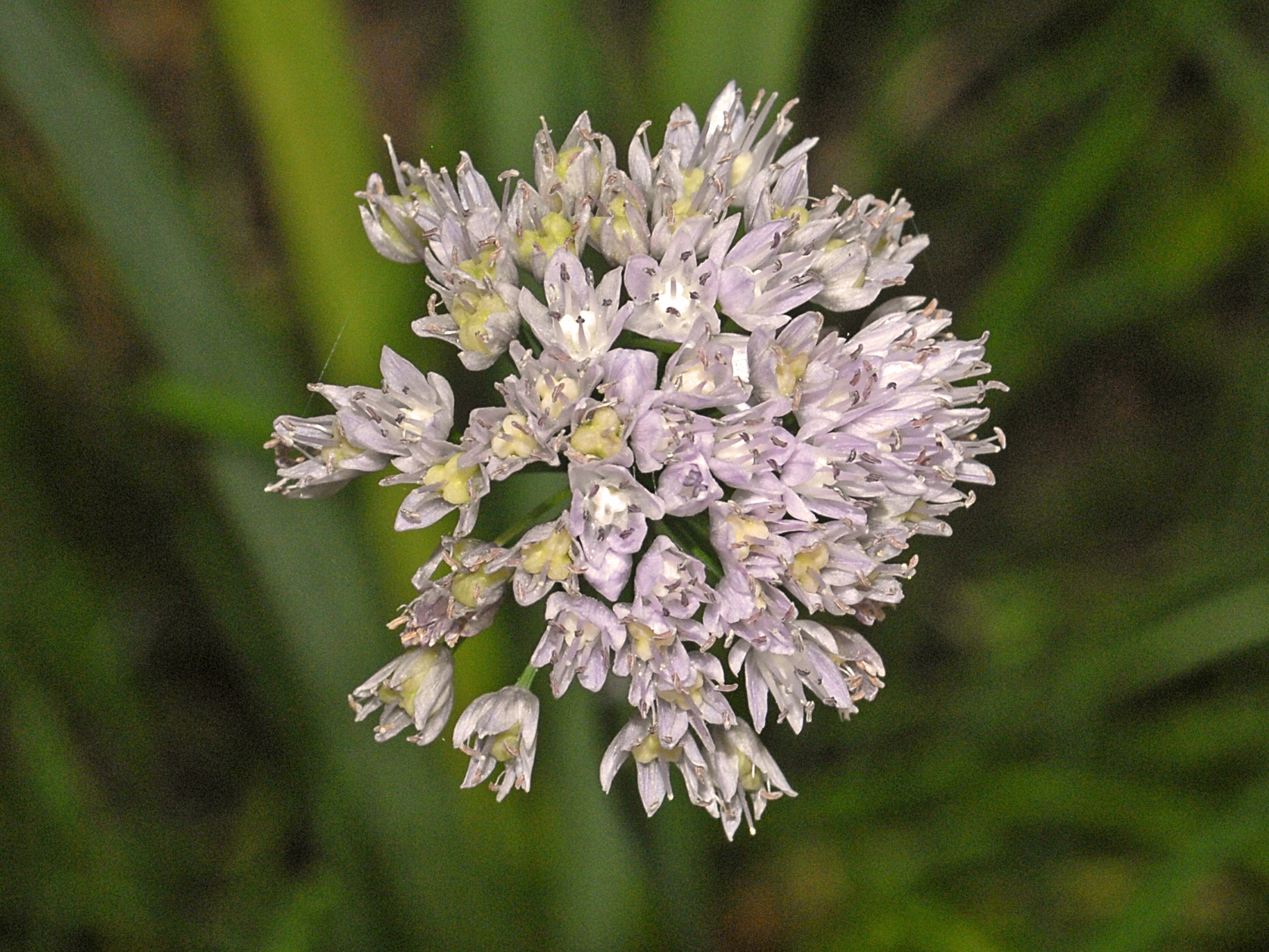

Scientific classification
- Kingdom: Plantae
- Clade: Tracheophytes
- Clade: Angiosperms
- Clade: Monocots
- Order: Asparagales
- Family: Amaryllidaceae
- Subfamily: Allioideae
- Genus: Allium
- Subgenus: A. subg. Reticulatobulbosa
- Species: A. strictum

Binomial name
- Allium strictum Schrad.

Synonyms
- Synonymy: Allium angustum G.Don; Allium lineare Willd. ex Kunth 1843, illegitimate homonym not L. 1753; Allium lineare var. strictum (Schrad.) Trevir.; Allium lineare var. strictum Krylov; Allium microcephalum Tausch; Allium reticulatum J.Presl & C.Presl; Allium suaveolens Gaudin 1828, illegitimate homonym not Jacq. 1789; Allium volhynicum Besser; Porrum strictum (Schrad.) Rchb.

= Allium strictum =

Species of flowering plant

Allium strictum is a Eurasian species of wild onion. Its native range extends from France to Yakutia.

Allium strictum produces one or two bulbs, each up to 8 mm in diameter. Scape is up to 80 cm tall. Leaves are flat, narrow, shorter than the scape, about 4 mm wide. Umbels are spherical with many flowers crowded together. Tepals are rose-pink or reddish-purple with a dark purple midvein. It grows on stony slopes and cliffs.
