= Claopodium crispifolium =

Scientific classification
- Kingdom: Plantae
- Division: Bryophyta
- Class: Bryopsida
- Subclass: Bryidae
- Order: Hypnales
- Family: Leskeaceae
- Genus: Claopodium
- Species: C. crispifolium

Binomial name
- Claopodium crispifolium (Hook.) Renauld & Cardot

Synonyms
- Thuidium crispifolium (Hook.) Lindb.; Hypnum crispifolium Hook.

Species of plant

Claopodium crispifolium, crispleaf roughmoss, is a moss species in the family Leskeaceae. It is an epiphyte growing on trees in North America.

== Etymology ==
The genus name, Claopodium, refers to "breaking off at the foot" while the specific name, crispifolium, refers to curling of the leaves when the plant becomes dry.

== Distribution ==
This species is native to North America. It is commonly found along the western coast. The species has been observed in Japan, western Russia and China. In Canada, the species has been observed in British Columbia and Alberta. In the U.S., the species has been observed in Alaska, California, Idaho, Montana, Oregon, and Washington.

== Habitat ==
C. crispifolium is commonly found growing epiphytically on trees, but can grow on boulders, cliffs, and fallen logs. It is rarely terrestrial. It prefers to grow in shaded, moist environments and usually at elevations near sea level.

== Gametophytic features ==
C. crispifolium displays pleurocarpous growth. Its shoots generally have a yellow-green to a bright green colour and form a moderately thick mat over the substratum. Leaves and shoots are rather dull. The tips of the shoots and branches tend to be a lighter shade than the older, proximal parts. Branches are pinnately organized and are regularly branched on a single plane.

=== Leaves ===
The leaves are spirally arranged around the branches and can become contorted when the plant is dry. The leaves are broad at the base and reach a point at the apex. This leaf structure can be described as ovate-lanceolate. The leaves are approximately 3 mm (0.12 in) long and 0.4–0.8 mm (0.016–0.031 in) wide. The base of the leaves have auricles that extend down to the stem. The leaves have a prominent multi-stratose costa. Costa cells are elongate and pellucid. Laminal cells have one papilla per cell (unipapillose), which gives the species its characteristic dull appearance. The alar region does not have distinct cells that differentiate from the surrounding cells.

=== Stem ===
The stem has leaves similar to the branch leaves. The stems are moderately creeping and are approximately 4–8 cm (1.6–3.1 in) long. The stem has a large cortex with a conducting strand in the center. The conducting strand is composed of hydroids.

== Sporophytic structures ==
The plant is classified as dioecious. Sporophytes are abundant in late winter and typically mature in early spring After maturity, the sporangia are approximately 1.5–3 mm (0.059–0.118 in) long and develop a red-brown colour with a dull looking operculum. The operculum is long-snouted and can be labelled as a rostrum. The mature sporangium have two rows of peristome teeth (exostome and endostome). The exostome teeth are lance-shaped and bordered with multiple ridges and papillae. The endostome teeth are cilia knobby. The seta is red-brown, 10–20 mm (0.39–0.79 in) tall and rough. The seta is also papillose. The seta is a defining morphological characteristic.

== Conservation status ==
C. crispifolium is not considered endangered and as of 1992, was globally ranked as G4 (apparently secure). In Canada, the species is declared N4N5 which means it is nationally ranked as "apparently secure" and "secure". In British Columbia, it is declared S4S5.

== Similar species ==
C. crispifolium can sometimes be mistaken for Claopodium bolanderi. These two species share morphological features but C. bolanderi is usually found at higher elevations. Leaf cells in C. bolanderi contain multiple papillae per cell while C. crispifolium are unipapillose.
