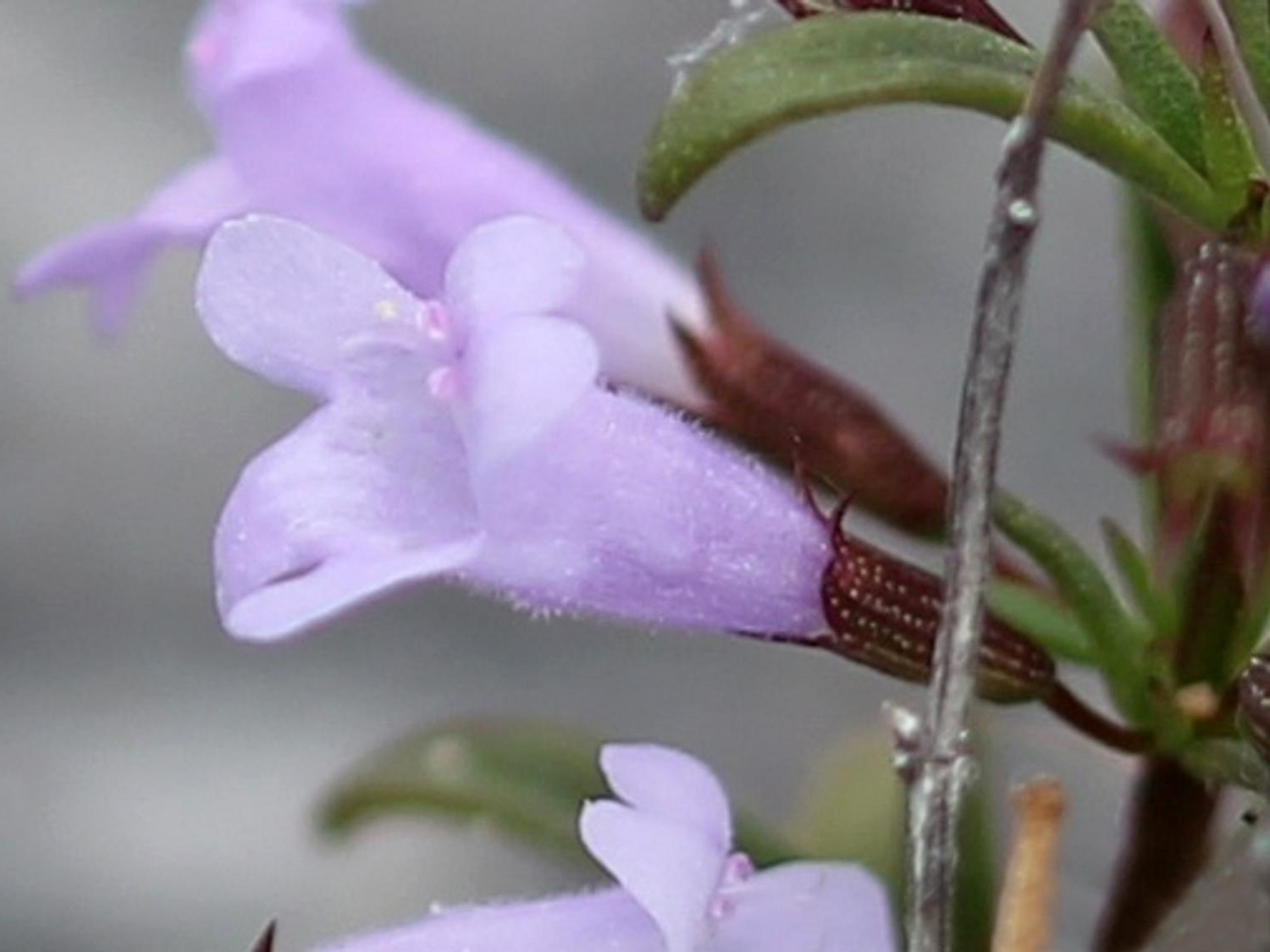

Scientific classification
- Kingdom: Plantae
- Clade: Tracheophytes
- Clade: Angiosperms
- Clade: Eudicots
- Clade: Asterids
- Order: Lamiales
- Family: Lamiaceae
- Genus: Clinopodium
- Species: C. arkansanum

Binomial name
- Clinopodium arkansanum (Nutt.) House

Synonyms
- List: Homotypic synonyms; Calamintha arkansana (Nutt.) Shinners; Hedeoma arkansana Nutt.; Micromeria arkansana (Nutt.) Benth.; Satureja arkansana (Nutt.) Briq. Heterotypic synonyms; Calamintha glabella A.Gray; Calamintha glabella var. angustifolia (Torr.) DeWolf; Calamintha glabella var. diversifolia Alph.Wood; Calamintha glabella var. nuttallii (Benth.) A.Gray; Calamintha nuttallii Benth.; Clinopodium glabrum Kuntze; Cunila glabella Torr.; Hedeoma glabra Nutt.; Micromeria glabella var. angustifolia Torr.; Rafinesquia angustifolia Raf.; Satureja glabella var. angustifolia (Torr.) Svenson; Satureja glabra (Kuntze) Fernald

= Clinopodium arkansanum =

Species of flowering plant

Clinopodium arkansanum is a species of North American flowering plant in the family Lamiaceae. It is commonly known as limestone calamint.

== Description ==
Clinopodium arkansanum is a perennial herbaceous plant that can reach approximately 5–30 cm (2–12 inches) in height, with four-angled, green to reddish-purple stems. The leaves are oval in shape, about 3 mm (0.12 in) across and 1–3 cm (0.5–1 in) long, with untoothed margins and no leaf stalks. They are arranged opposite but often appear whorled because of the plant's habit of growing additional leaves in the main leaf axils. The white to purple mint-like flowers bloom mainly in spring and summer. They grow from the leaf axils and measure about 12 mm (0.47 in) in length. The fruit is a one-seeded nutlet.

== Habitat and distribution ==
The plant grows naturally in southeastern North America, native to the American states of Arkansas, Illinois, Indiana, Kansas, Michigan, Minnesota, Missouri, New Mexico, New York, Ohio, Oklahoma, Pennsylvania, Tennessee, Texas, Virginia, West Virginia, and Wisconsin, and the Canadian province of Ontario. Its habitat includes mainly moist to wet soil containing limestone, and it grows best in full sun.

== Names ==
This plant has several taxonomic synonyms. Common names include limestone calamint, low calamint, wild savory, Ozark calamint and Arkansas mint.
