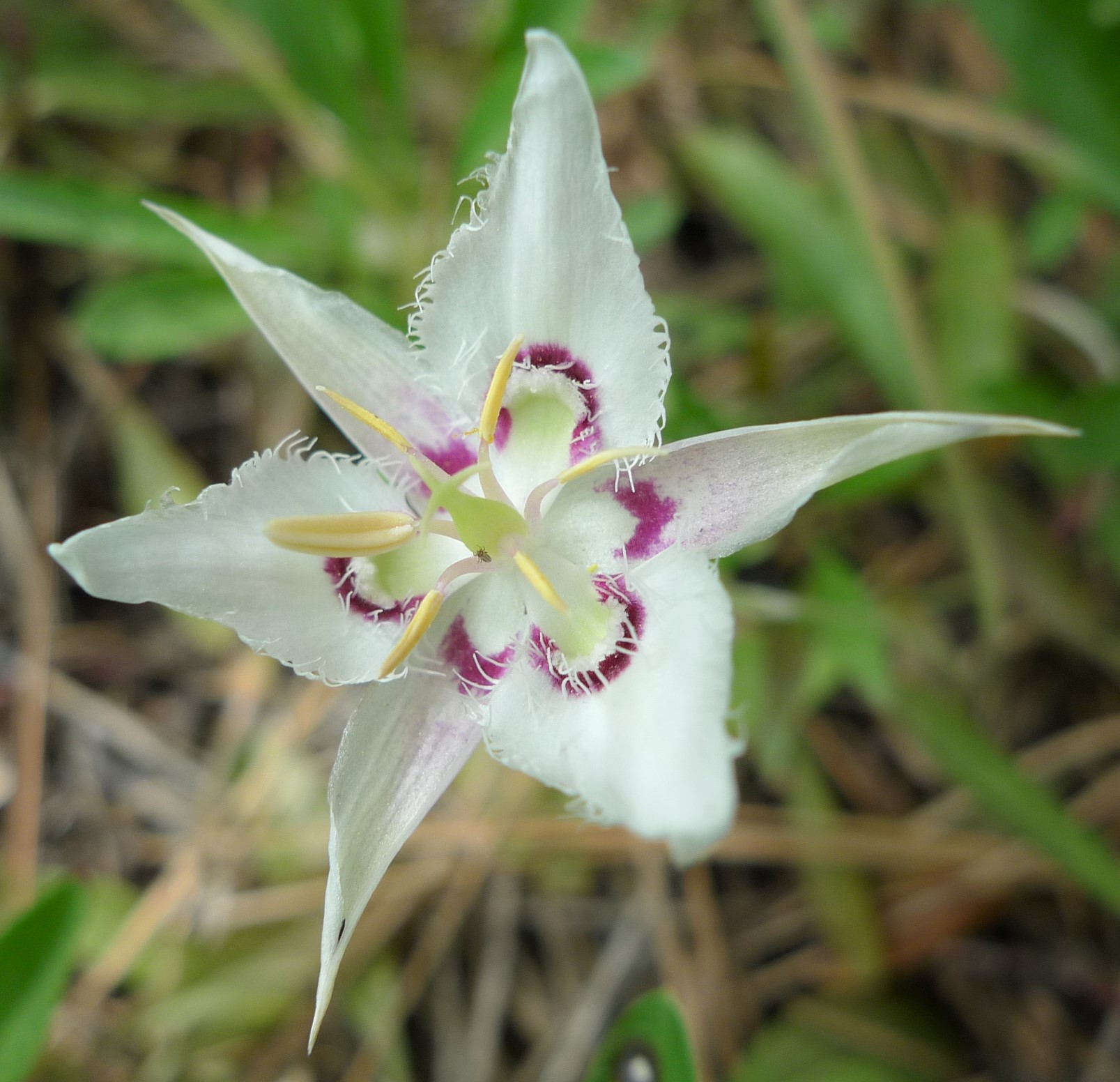
- Calochortus lyallii in Icicle Canyon, Chelan County Washington

Conservation status
- Vulnerable (NatureServe)

Scientific classification
- Kingdom: Plantae
- Clade: Embryophytes
- Clade: Tracheophytes
- Clade: Spermatophytes
- Clade: Angiosperms
- Clade: Monocots
- Order: Liliales
- Family: Liliaceae
- Genus: Calochortus
- Species: C. lyallii

Binomial name
- Calochortus lyallii Baker

Synonyms
- Calochortus ciliatus B.L.Rob. & Seaton

= Calochortus lyallii =

Species of flowering plant

Calochortus lyallii, or Lyall's mariposa lily, is a North American species of flowering plant in the lily family. It is native and endemic to Province of British Columbia in western Canada, as well as the State of Washington in the northwestern United States. It only grows east of the Cascade crest in the mountains and foothills, and though its numbers are apparently secure in Washington, it is considered to be a blue-listed species in Canada- blue-listed taxa are at risk, but are not extirpated, endangered or threatened. It is found in dry to mesic open forest at lower to middle elevations in the mountains, commonly found with Pinus ponderosa (Ponderosa pine), Pseudotsuga menziesii (Douglas fir), Calamagrostis rubescens (pinegrass) and Carex geyeri (elk sedge).

== Description ==
Calochortus lyallii is a bulb-producing perennial herb up to about 50 centimeters tall. Flowers are upright, bell-shaped, white to pale violet with darker markings on the petals.

== Gallery ==
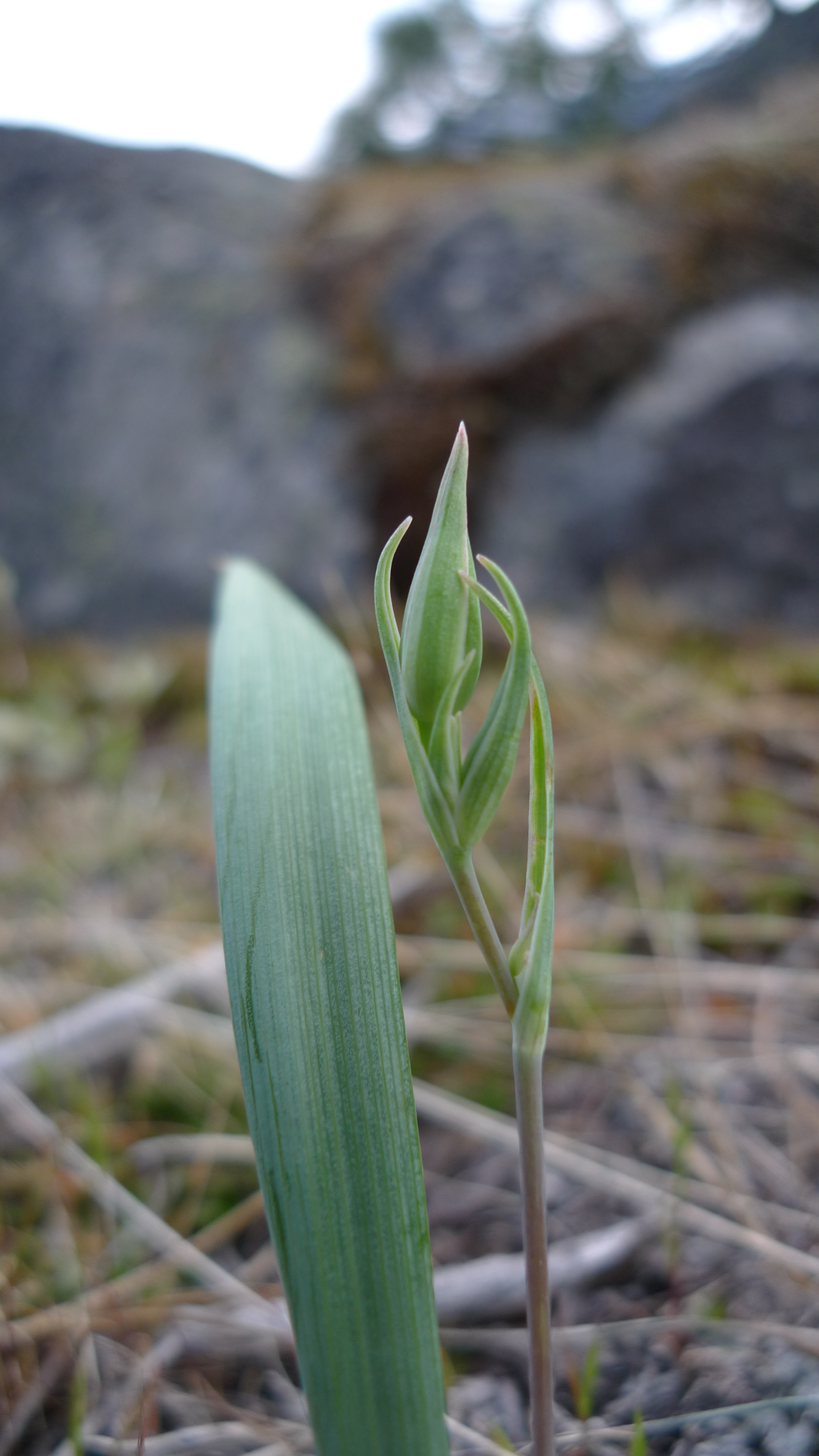
Calochortus lyallii pre-flowering

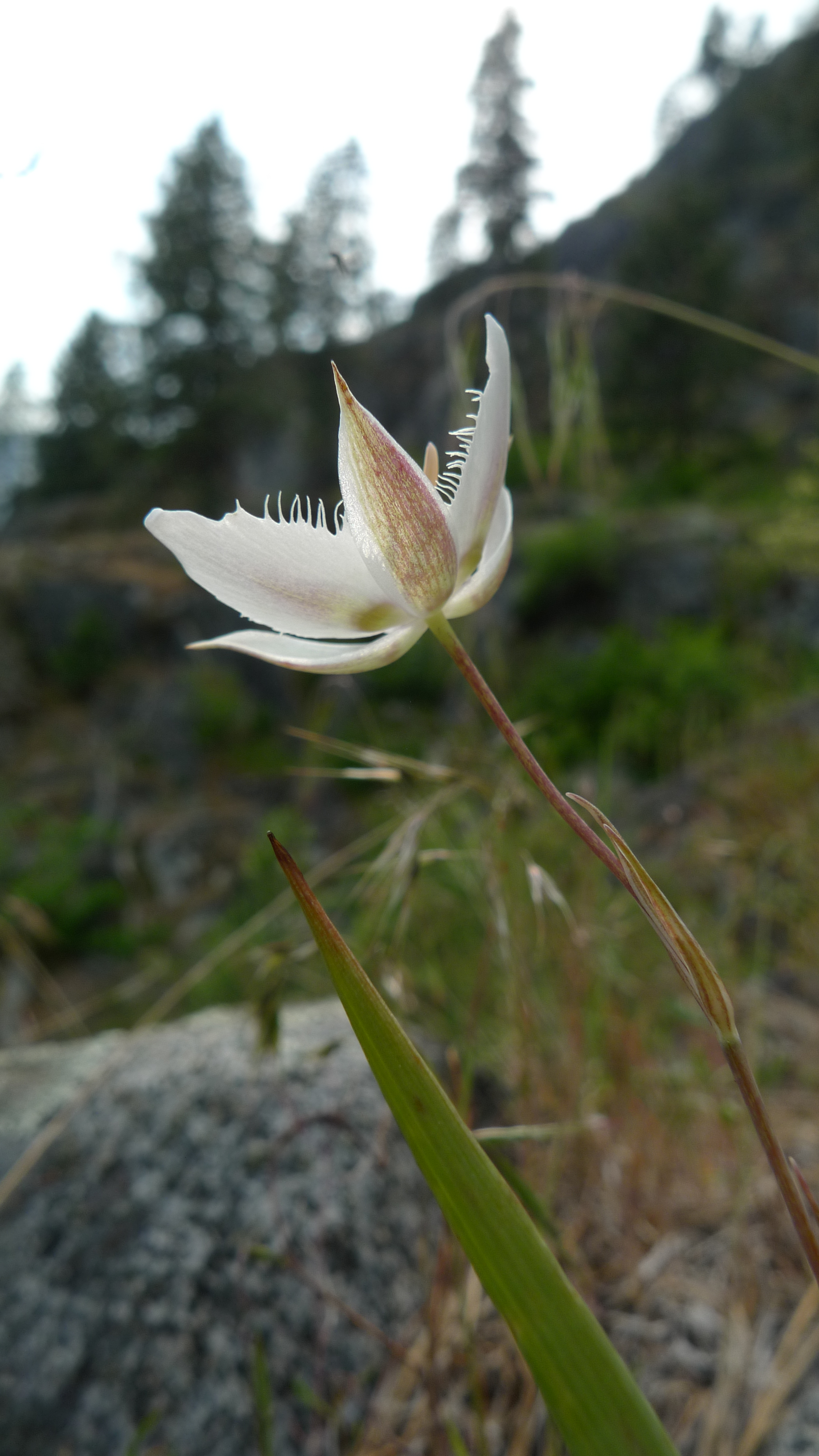
Calochortus lyallii

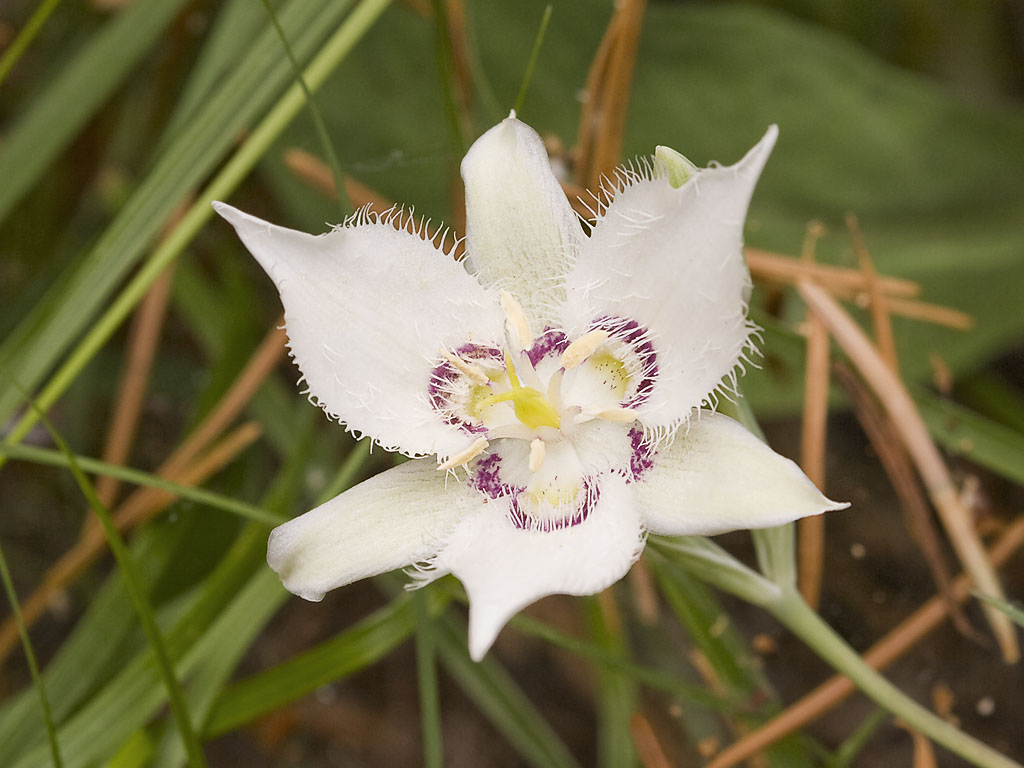
Calochortus lyallii - Flickr 003

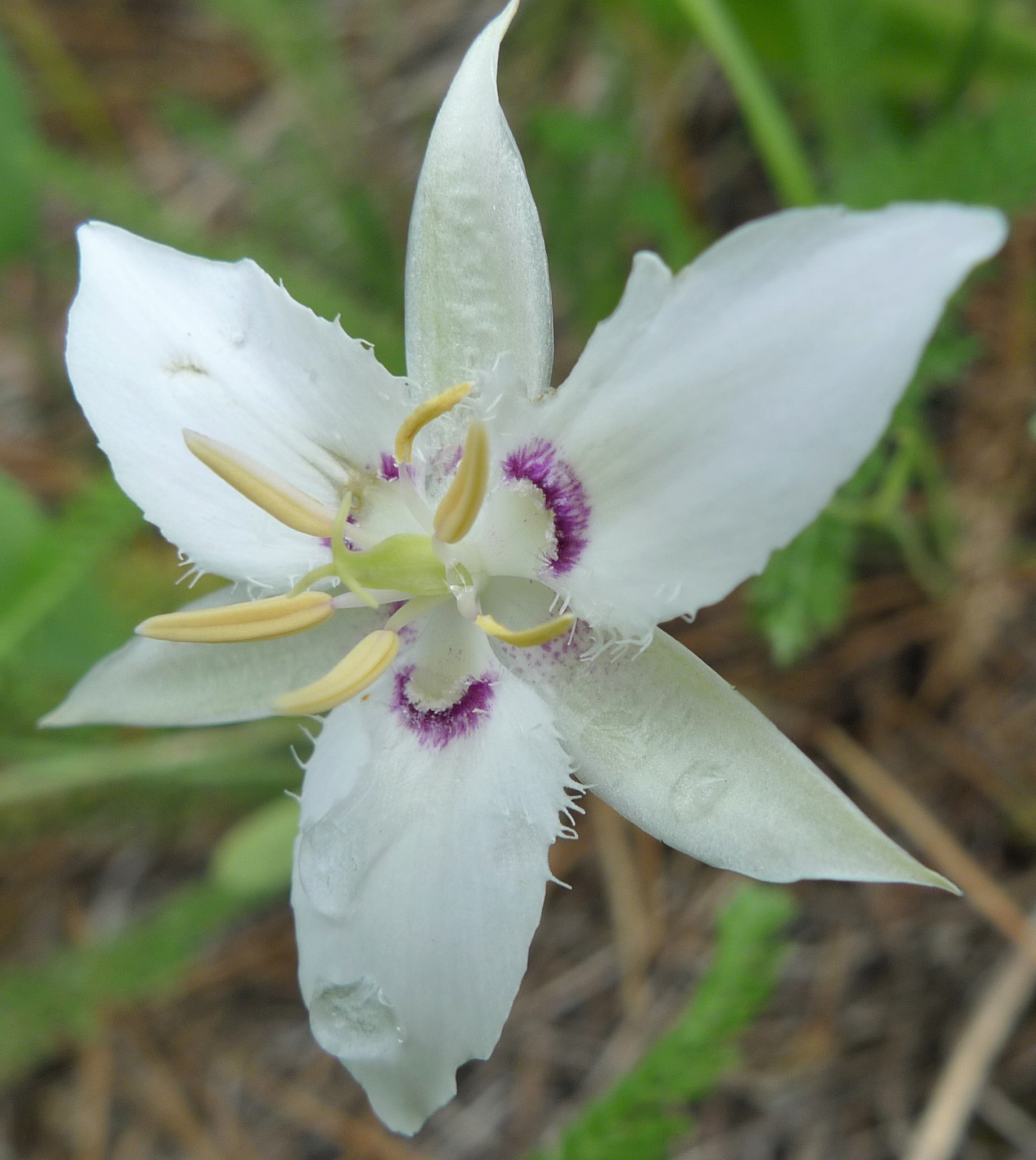
Calochortus lyallii 5
