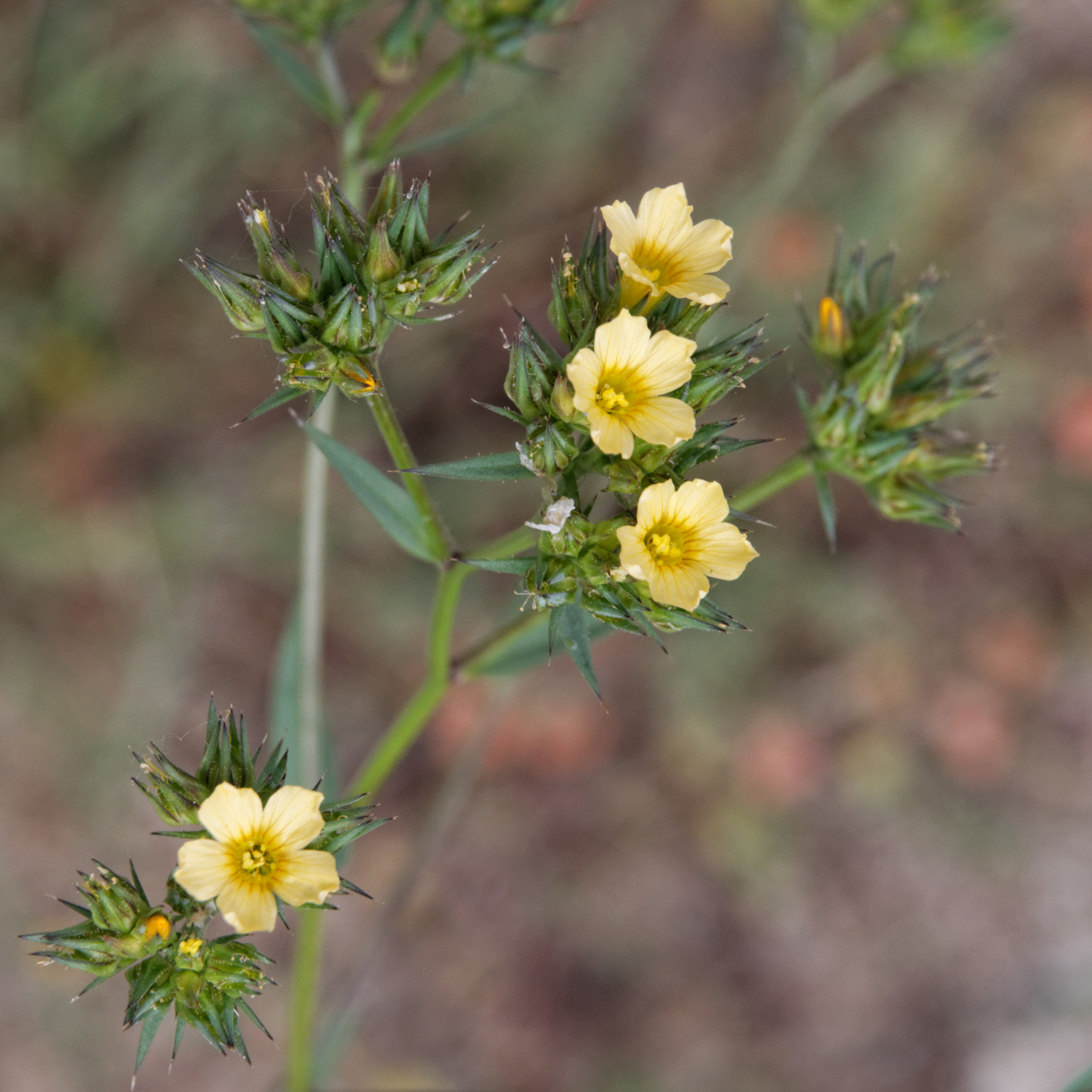

Scientific classification
- Kingdom: Plantae
- Clade: Tracheophytes
- Clade: Angiosperms
- Clade: Eudicots
- Clade: Rosids
- Order: Malpighiales
- Family: Linaceae
- Genus: Linum
- Species: L. strictum

Binomial name
- Linum strictum L.

Synonyms
- Linum strictum subsp. corymbulosum (Rchb.) Rouy; Linum strictum var. spicatum Pers.

= Linum strictum =

Species of flax

Linum strictum, commonly known as rigid flax, upright flax, and upright yellow flax, is a species of flax with a rigid stem, from whence it derives its taxonomic name, growing to a height of 10–45 cm. The plant is endemic to the Mediterranean region, as well as native to Sudan, Ethiopia, Eritrea, Croatia, Bosnia and Herzegovina, Montenegro, Crimea, Albania, Portugal, Jordan, Iraq, Iran, Madeira, the Canary Islands, the Transcaucasus, Saudi Arabia (Asir), Bahrain, Qatar, Pakistan, and northwest India. It features highly in classical Hebrew and Greek literature, owing principally to its cultivation for its plant fiber, linen, but also for its edible seeds and culinary foliage.

== Habitat ==
Linum strictum prefers well-lighted habitats, mostly in dry hills, sandy and rocky places, and vineyards. Its range is from southern Europe and North Africa, all along the Mediterranean as far as the Levant, and east to Afghanistan and Iran.

== Description ==
Linum strictum is a therophyte (annual), one of many annual plants that complete their lives rapidly in favorable conditions and survive the unfavorable cold or dry season in the form of seeds. In the Levant, the plant blossoms between February and May; the flowers being of a light yellow colour, each bearing 5 sepals (4-6 mm) and 5 petals (6-12 mm), with 5 stamens, and having a gynoecium bearing five connected styles running lengthwise. Its stigmas are capitate, resembling the head of a pin. The plant bears ovate-lanceolate leaves, with margins minutely serrulate, very rough, often inrolled.

The fruit is a symmetrical drum-shaped capsule, remaining dry as it rests closely against the mother plant for many months, until the seeds therein gradually scatter.

The species is divided into the following subspecies: Linum strictum subsp. spicatum, which grows chiefly in Cyprus, Linum strictum subsp. strictum, and Linum strictum subsp. racemosum.

== References in classical literature ==
Flax linen was grown principally for its plant fiber used in making linen cloth, its production was thought to be essential for the textile industry of that time. According to the Mishnah (Baba Kama 10:9), in 2nd-century Judea, women were the primary sellers of wool, and they sold garments of flax in Galilee. According to Midrash Rabba (Genesis Rabba 19:1), the people of Beit Shean would make very fine (thinly woven) linen garments which were expensive to buy, but which would spoil easily at the slightest smear of charcoal. Likewise, the inhabitants of Arbel (now Khirbet Irbid) were also renowned for making linen garments, but these were made of a much thicker weave and were cheaper to buy, and they would normally last longer.

Historically, linen production has played an important role in Jewish agrarian laws, as well as in religious rites and ceremony. There are strict regulations regarding its wearing with woollen fabrics. Textiles made from a mixture of linen and wool are prohibited to be worn under religious Jewish law. At the time of the flax harvest, the Sages have even defined how many stalks of flax that were forgotten in the field by their owner can be esteemed as "forgotten sheaves," enabling their finder to possess them, without him being guilty of theft. What constitutes a violation of Sabbath-day laws is also discussed with regard to flax, as bundles of freshly retted flax were permitted to be placed inside a heated earthenware oven in order to accelerate the evaporation-rate of moisture remaining in the flax, so long as this could be done before the night of Sabbath had commenced. After drying, and after the limitations of the Sabbath had passed, it facilitated scutching of the flax stalks, for the production of bast fiber.

In the ancient land of Israel, flax was harvested in the lunar month of Adar (March), but by the late 19th-century, the cultivation of flax had completely disappeared from Palestine. To procure a whiter fabric, the leaves of bladder campion (Silene venosa) were traditionally used to bleach the flax fibers.

Dioscorides, in the Second Book of his De Materia Medica (2:125), brings down the plant's medicinal uses in his day.

=== Culinary usage ===
In ancient times, the green sprouts and tender leaves of flax (Linum strictum) were served in a hot dish of kūtaḥ (consisting of milk whey, stale bread crumbs, vinegar, and salt), for added flavour. In some cultures, flaxseed is traditionally roasted, ground to a powder, and eaten with boiled rice, a little water, and a little salt. Tender, germinated sprouts of flax-seeds, when eaten together with sprouts of celery seeds (Apium graveolens) and fenugreek (Trigonella foenum-graecum), are said to have a cooling effect on the entire body.

== See also ==
- Flax
