= Linum decumbens =

Scientific classification
- Kingdom: Plantae
- Clade: Tracheophytes
- Clade: Angiosperms
- Clade: Eudicots
- Clade: Rosids
- Order: Malpighiales
- Family: Linaceae
- Genus: Linum
- Species: L. decumbens

Binomial name
- Linum decumbens Desf.

Species of plant

Linum decumbens is a species of plants in the family Linaceae.

== Sources ==
This article incorporates text from a free content work. Licensed under CC0 (license statement/permission). Text taken from Linum decumbens. Encyclopedia of Life.
