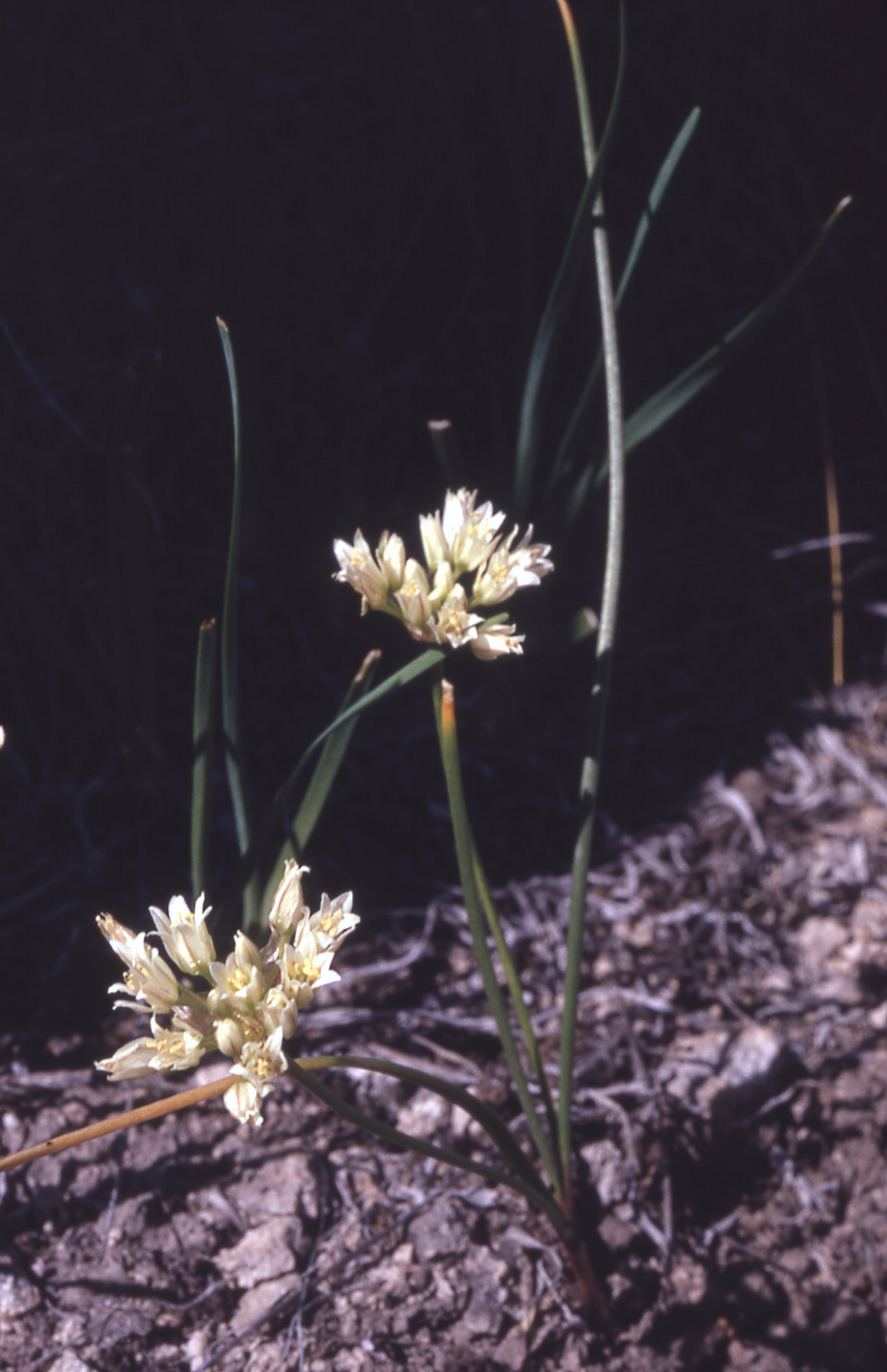

Conservation status
- Secure (NatureServe)

Scientific classification
- Kingdom: Plantae
- Clade: Embryophytes
- Clade: Tracheophytes
- Clade: Spermatophytes
- Clade: Angiosperms
- Clade: Monocots
- Order: Asparagales
- Family: Amaryllidaceae
- Subfamily: Allioideae
- Genus: Allium
- Subgenus: A. subg. Amerallium
- Species: A. textile

Binomial name
- Allium textile A.Nelson & J.F.Macbr.

Synonyms
- List: Allium angulosum; Allium aridum; Allium reticulatum; Maligia laxa

= Allium textile =

Prairie onion

North American onion species

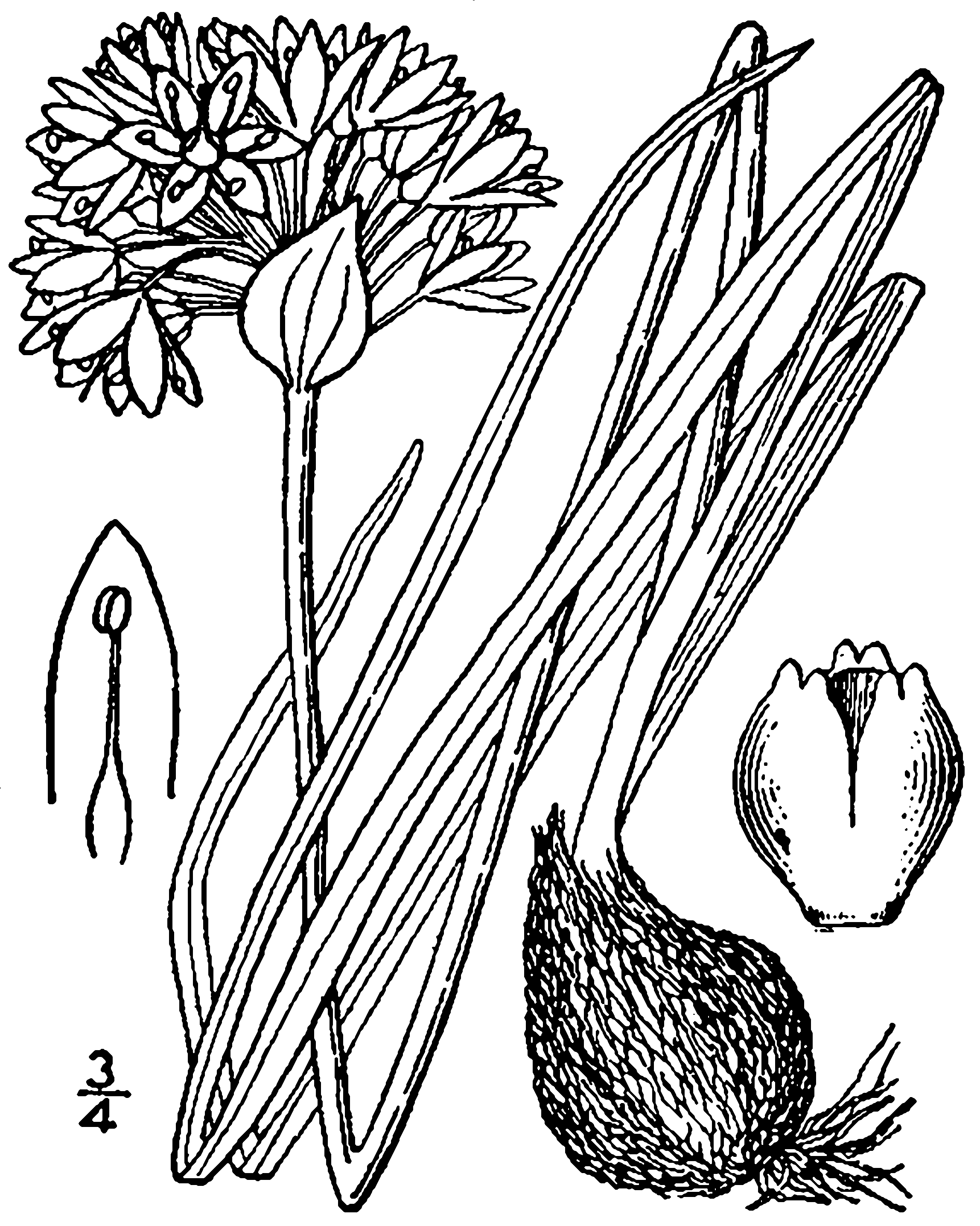
1913 illustration

Allium textile (prairie onion or textile onion) is a common species of wild onion found in the central part of North America.

== Description ==
A. textile produces egg-shaped bulbs up to 2.5 cm long. There are no rhizomes. Scapes are round in cross-section, up to 40 cm tall. Flowers are bell-shaped or urn-shaped, about 6 mm in diameter; tepals white or pink with reddish-brown midribs; pollen and anthers yellow.

== Taxonomy ==
In 1827 George Don described a new species in the genus Allium, however he named it Allium reticulatum, a name that had already been used in 1819 by Jan Svatopluk Presl and Carl Borivoj Presl. In 1913 the botanists Aven Nelson and James Francis Macbride published Allium textile as the new name for the species. Together with its genus it is classified in the Amaryllidaceae family. A. textile is placed within section Amerallium, subgenus Amerallium.

The species has five synonyms.

Table of Synonyms
Name	Year	Rank	Notes
Allium angulosum Pursh	1813	species	= het., nom. illeg., not L. 1753
Allium aridum Rydb.	1917	species	= het.
Allium reticulatum Fraser ex G.Don	1827	species	≡ hom., nom. illeg., not J. Presl & C. Presl 1817
Allium reticulatum var. playanum M.E.Jones	1908	variety	= het.
Maligia laxa Raf.	1837	species	= het.
Notes: ≡ homotypic synonym; = heterotypic synonym

== Distribution and habitat ==
The native range of A. textile extends across the Great Plains states from Oklahoma to Montana and Minnesota, plus the Rocky Mountain and Great Basin states from northern New Mexico to Washington, plus the Canadian provinces of Alberta, Saskatchewan and Manitoba. There is also a report of an isolated population in Indiana. Allium textile grows on dry, sunlit locations at elevations of 300–2400 m.
