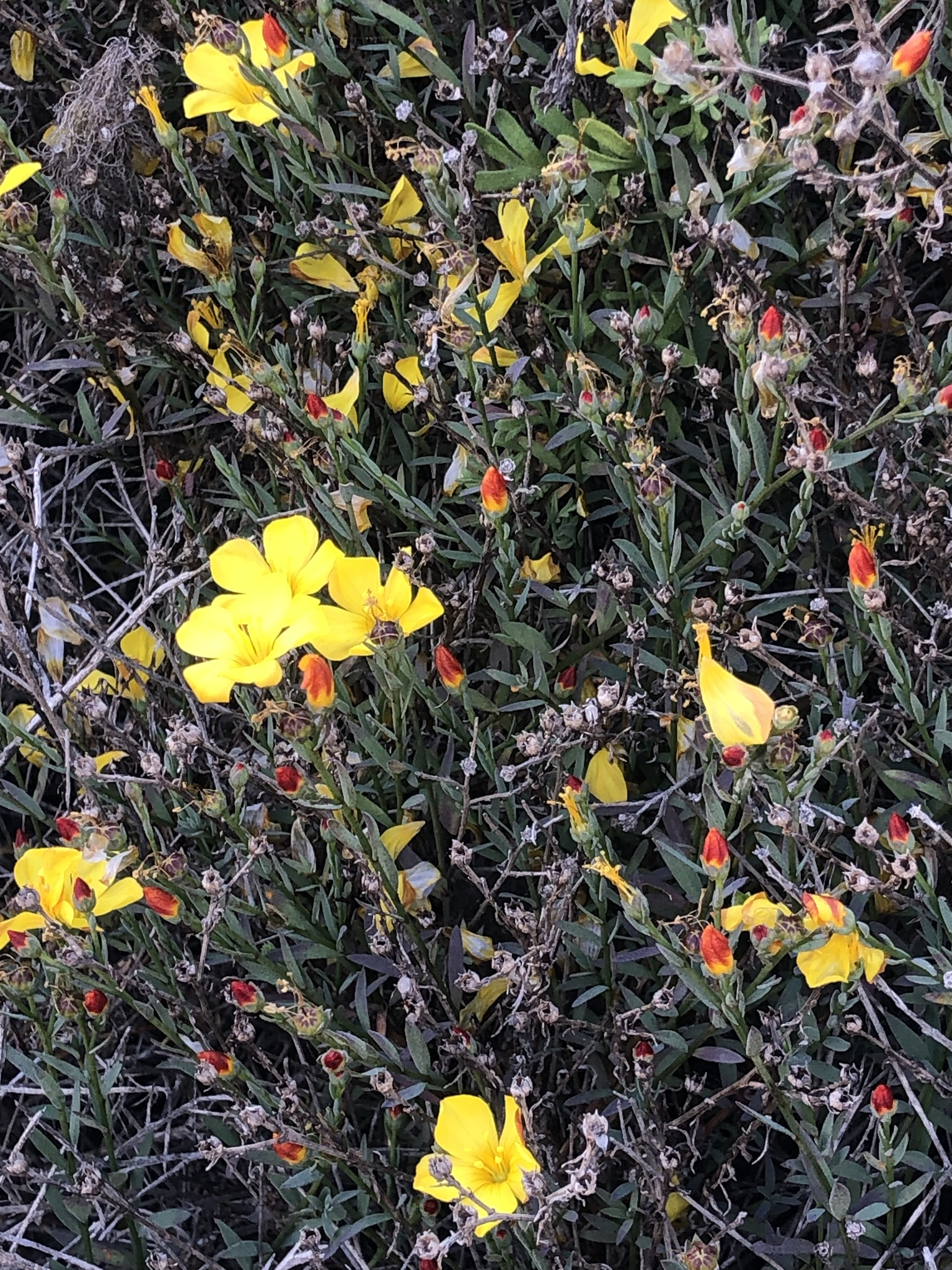

Scientific classification
- Kingdom: Plantae
- Clade: Tracheophytes
- Clade: Angiosperms
- Clade: Eudicots
- Clade: Rosids
- Order: Malpighiales
- Family: Linaceae
- Genus: Linum
- Species: L. ramosissimum

Binomial name
- Linum ramosissimum Gay

= Linum ramosissimum =

Species of plant

Linum ramosissimum is a species of flowering plant in the family Linaceae. It is a perennial herb endemic to the Coquimbo Region in northern Chile.
