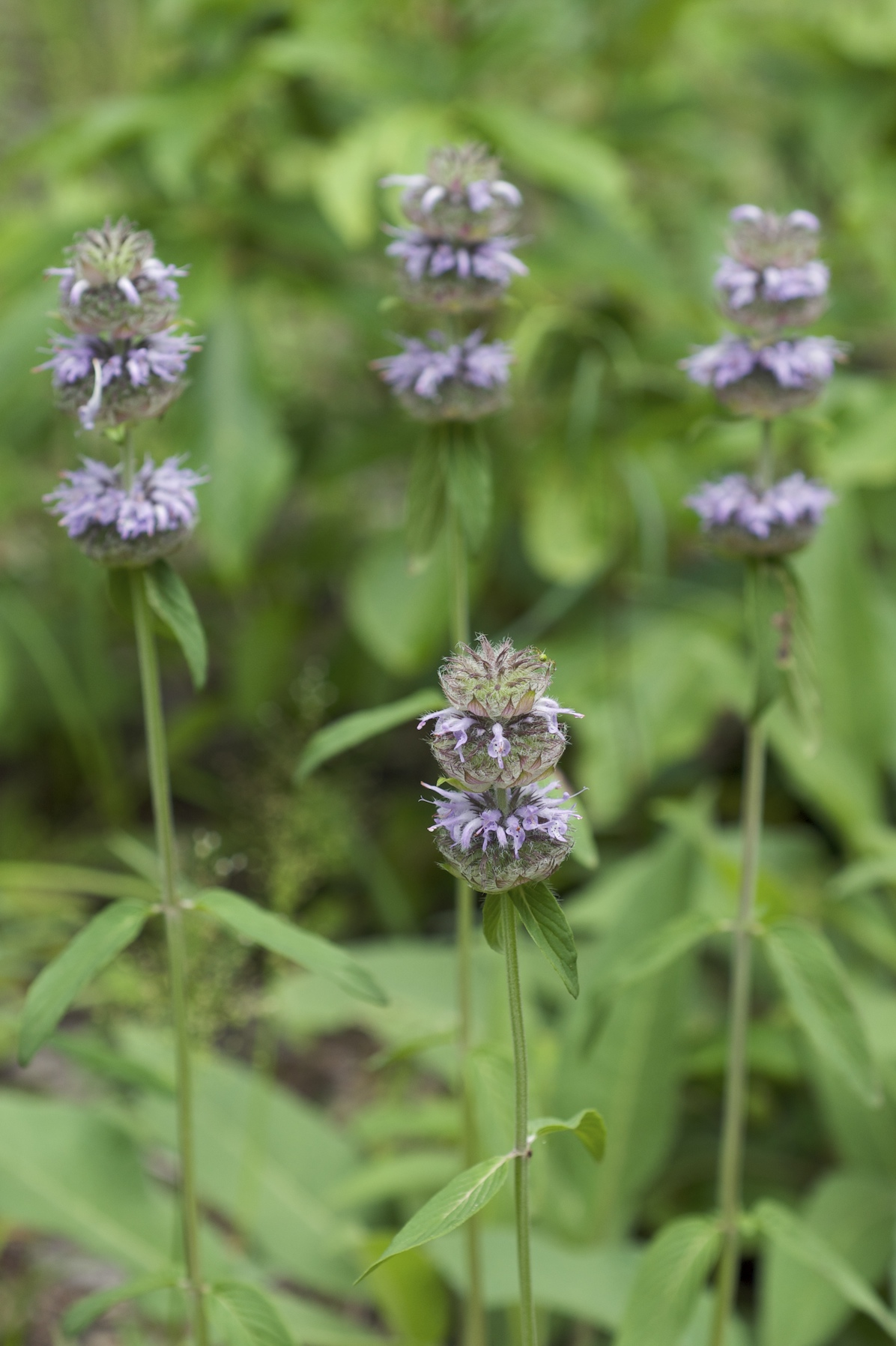
- Inflorescences

Conservation status
- Secure (NatureServe)

Scientific classification
- Kingdom: Plantae
- Clade: Tracheophytes
- Clade: Angiosperms
- Clade: Eudicots
- Clade: Asterids
- Order: Lamiales
- Family: Lamiaceae
- Genus: Blephilia
- Species: B. ciliata

Binomial name
- Blephilia ciliata (L.) Benth.

Synonyms
- List: Blephilia beckii Raf.; Blephilia brevifolia Raf.; Blephilia heterophyla Raf.; Blephilia pratensis Raf.; Monarda beckii Eaton; Monarda ciliata L.

= Blephilia ciliata =

Species of plant

Blephilia ciliata is a species of herbaceous perennial plant in the Lamiaceae (mint) family native to central and eastern North America. It is commonly called downy wood mint. Other common names include downy pagoda-plant, sunny woodmint and Ohio horsemint.

== Description ==
Blephilia ciliata grows as a perennial herb reaching 40 to 80 cm (15.5 to 31.5 in) high. The central stem is generally unbranched, except if it is damaged, side stems may form. As with many other plants in the mint family, the stem is 4-angled (square). Leaves are sessile, lightly toothed, and mildly fragrant when crushed. They are broadly ovate to lanceolate, are arranged oppositely on the stem, and measure up to 9 cm (3.5 in) long and 4 cm (1.5 in) across. Additionally, the basal leaves stay green through winter.

The inflorescence is a spike toward the end of the stem with 1 to 5 dense, headlike clusters spaced separately along the stem. Each of these clusters has numerous flowers resting on a pair of leaflike fringed bracts slightly longer than the flowers. Flower petal color can range from blue, purple or white.

== Taxonomy ==
Carl Linnaeus described the downy wood mint as Monarda ciliata, before George Bentham gave it its current binomial name.

== Distribution and habitat ==
B. ciliata is native in the United States from Oklahoma to the west, Mississippi to the south, Massachusetts to the east, and the Canadian border to the north. In Canada, it is native in Ontario. Its habitats include dry open woods and thickets, clearings, fields, and roadsides.

== Ecology ==
Flowers bloom from May to August and attract numerous bees, plus butterflies and skippers.

== Uses ==
It has traditionally been used by the Cherokee to make a poultice to treat headaches.
