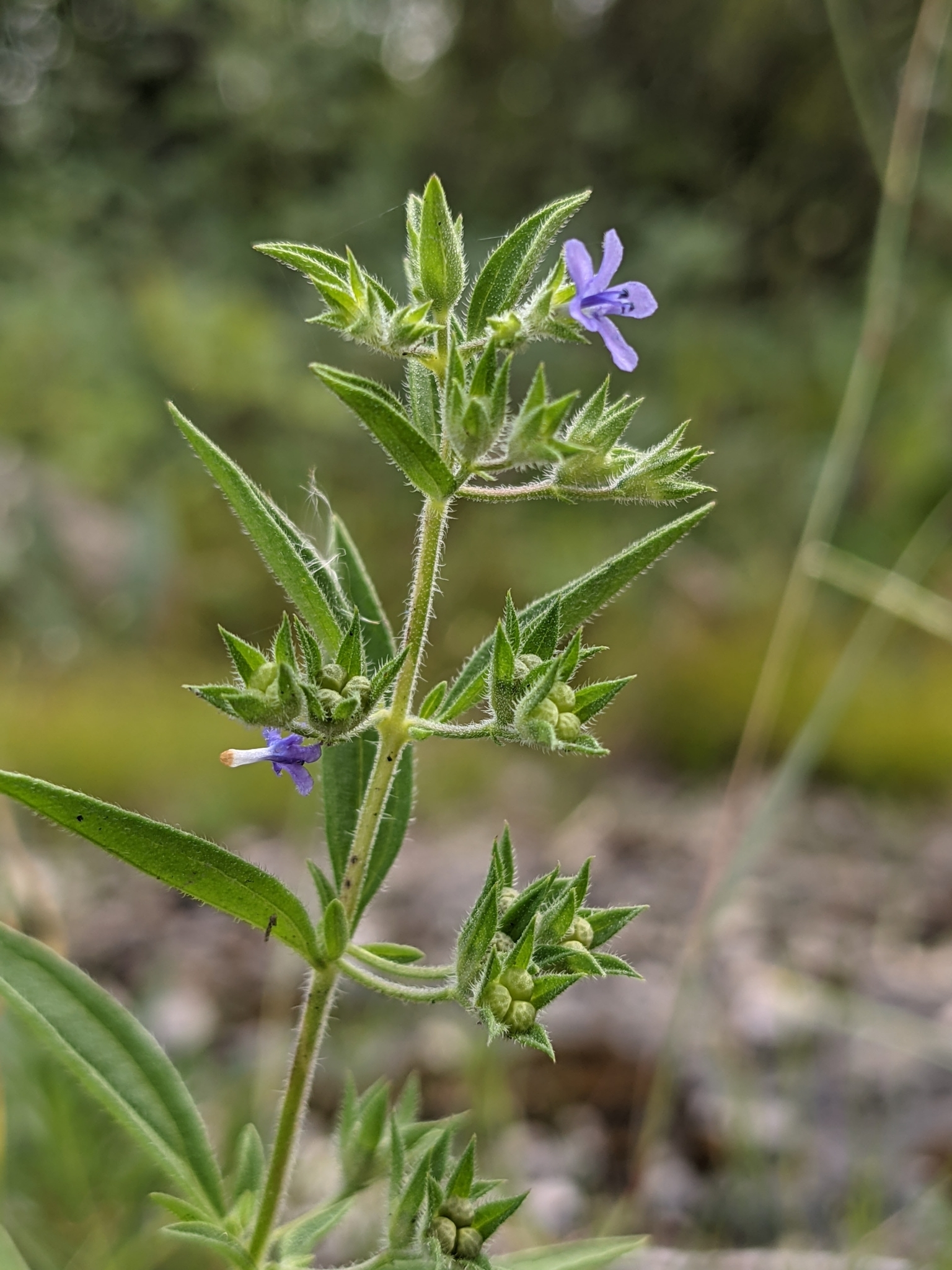

Conservation status
- Secure (NatureServe)

Scientific classification
- Kingdom: Plantae
- Clade: Tracheophytes
- Clade: Angiosperms
- Clade: Eudicots
- Clade: Asterids
- Order: Lamiales
- Family: Lamiaceae
- Genus: Trichostema
- Species: T. brachiatum

Binomial name
- Trichostema brachiatum L.

= Trichostema brachiatum =

Species of flowering plant

Trichostema brachiatum, commonly known as fluxweed or false pennyroyal, is a species of plant endemic to North America.

== Conservation status ==
In the United States, Trichostema brachiatum is listed as endangered in Connecticut, Massachusetts and in New Jersey. It is listed as threatened in Michigan.
