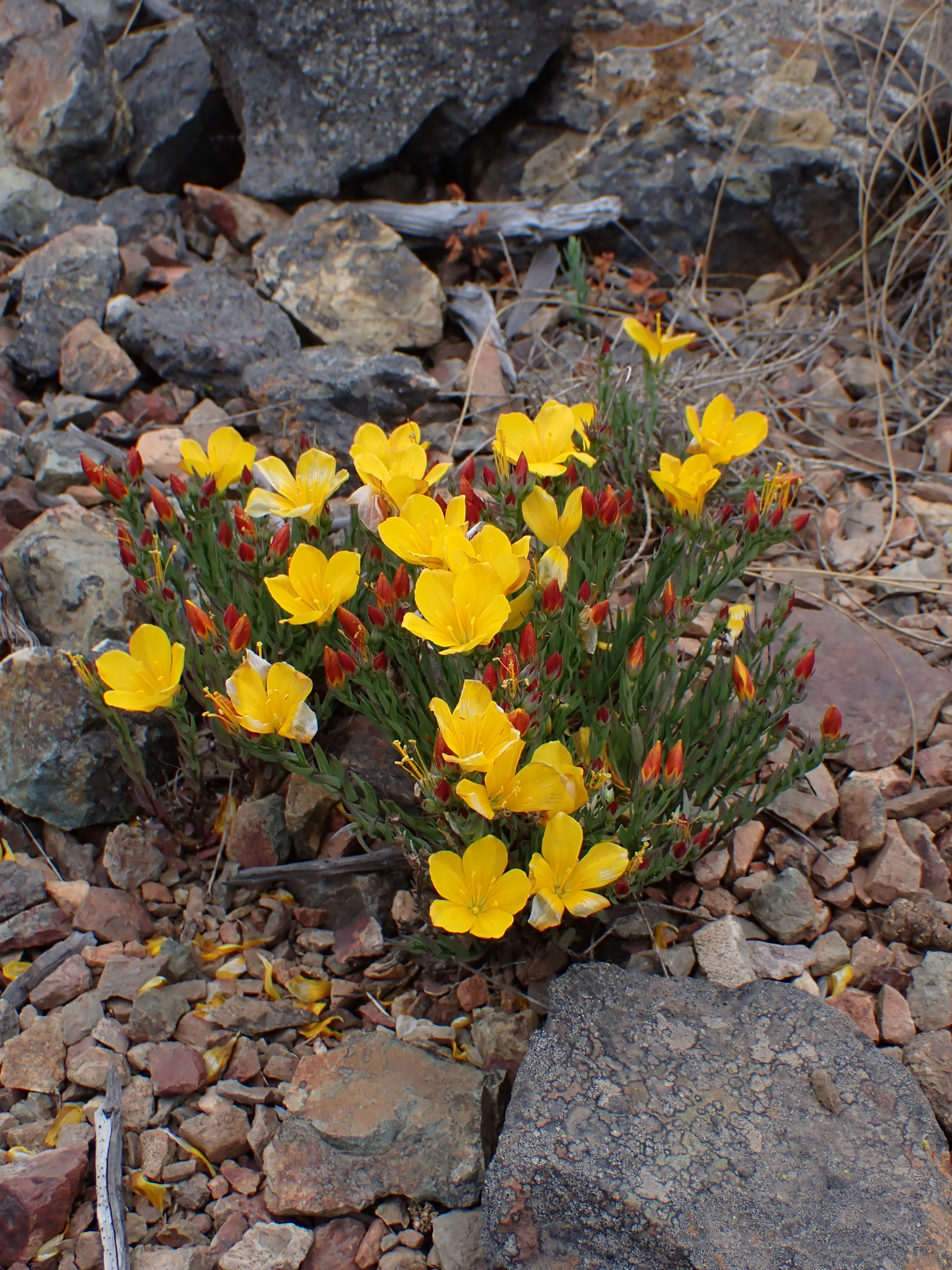

Scientific classification
- Kingdom: Plantae
- Clade: Tracheophytes
- Clade: Angiosperms
- Clade: Eudicots
- Clade: Rosids
- Order: Malpighiales
- Family: Linaceae
- Genus: Linum
- Species: L. macraei

Binomial name
- Linum macraei Benth.

= Linum macraei =

Species of plant

Linum macraei is a species of flowering plant in the family Linaceae. It is endemic to Central Chile.
