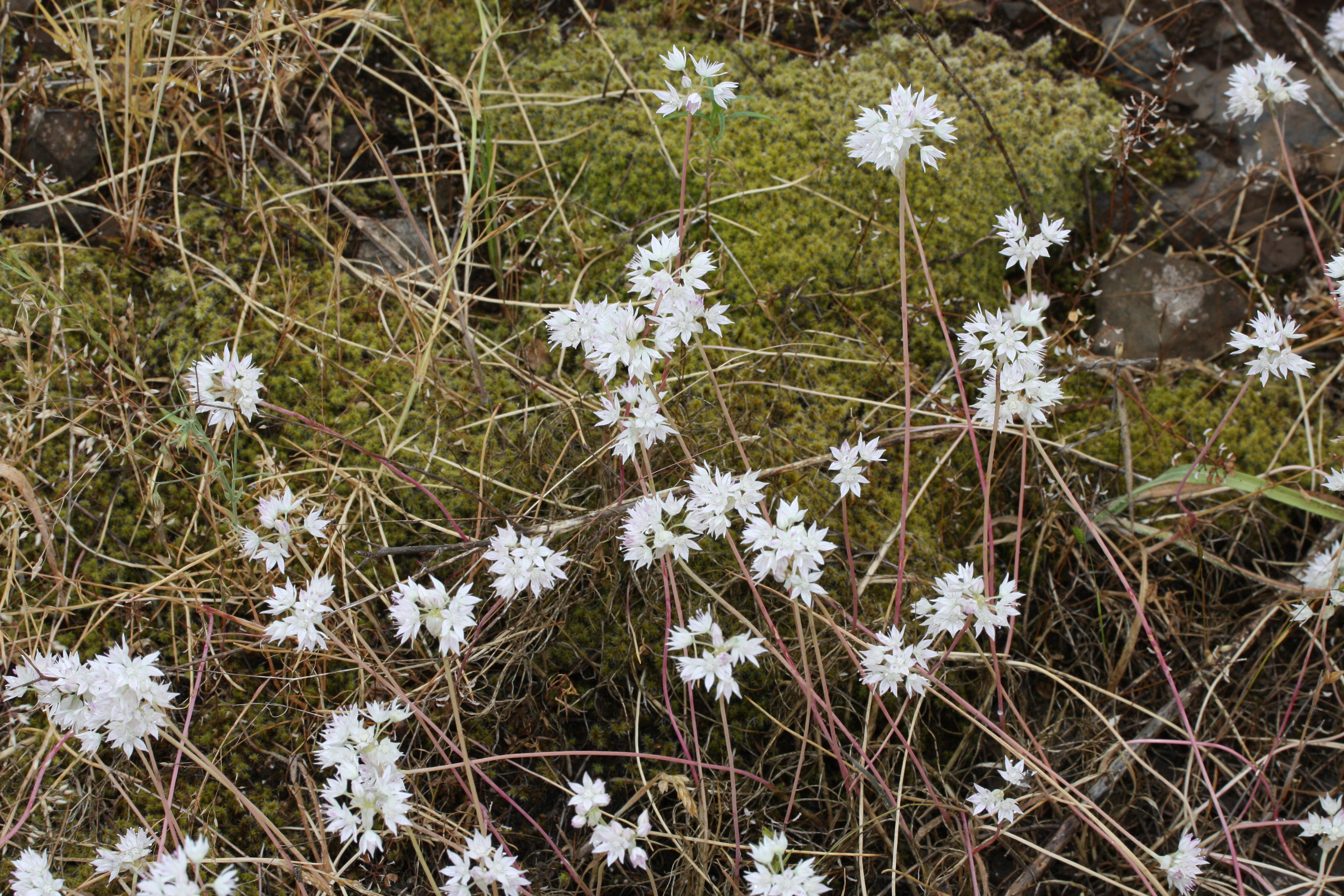
- In Linn County, Oregon

Scientific classification
- Kingdom: Plantae
- Clade: Tracheophytes
- Clade: Angiosperms
- Clade: Monocots
- Order: Asparagales
- Family: Amaryllidaceae
- Subfamily: Allioideae
- Genus: Allium
- Subgenus: A. subg. Amerallium
- Species: A. amplectens

Binomial name
- Allium amplectens Torr.

Synonyms
- Allium acuminatum var. gracile Alph.Wood; Allium attenuatum Kellogg; Allium attenuifolium Kellogg; Allium attenuifolium var. monospermum (Jeps. ex Greene) Jeps.; Allium monospermum Jeps. ex Greene; Allium occidentale A.Gray; Allium reticulatum Benth.; Allium serratum S.Watson

= Allium amplectens =

Narrowleaf onion

Species of flowering plant

Allium amplectens, the narrowleaf onion, is a species of flowering plant. It is an onion native to the west coast of the United States, in Oregon, Washington State and California, also British Columbia in Canada. It grows in woods and especially in clay and serpentine soils.

== Description ==
Growing to 50 cm (20 in) tall and broad, this herbaceous perennial grows from a pinkish-brown bulb and sends up a naked green stem topped with an inflorescence wrapped in bright pink or magenta bracts. These open to produce between 10 and 50 shiny white or pale pink flowers, each under a centimeter wide. The six stout stamens and the ovary are white or tinted pink or lavender.

Cultivars include 'Graceful'.
