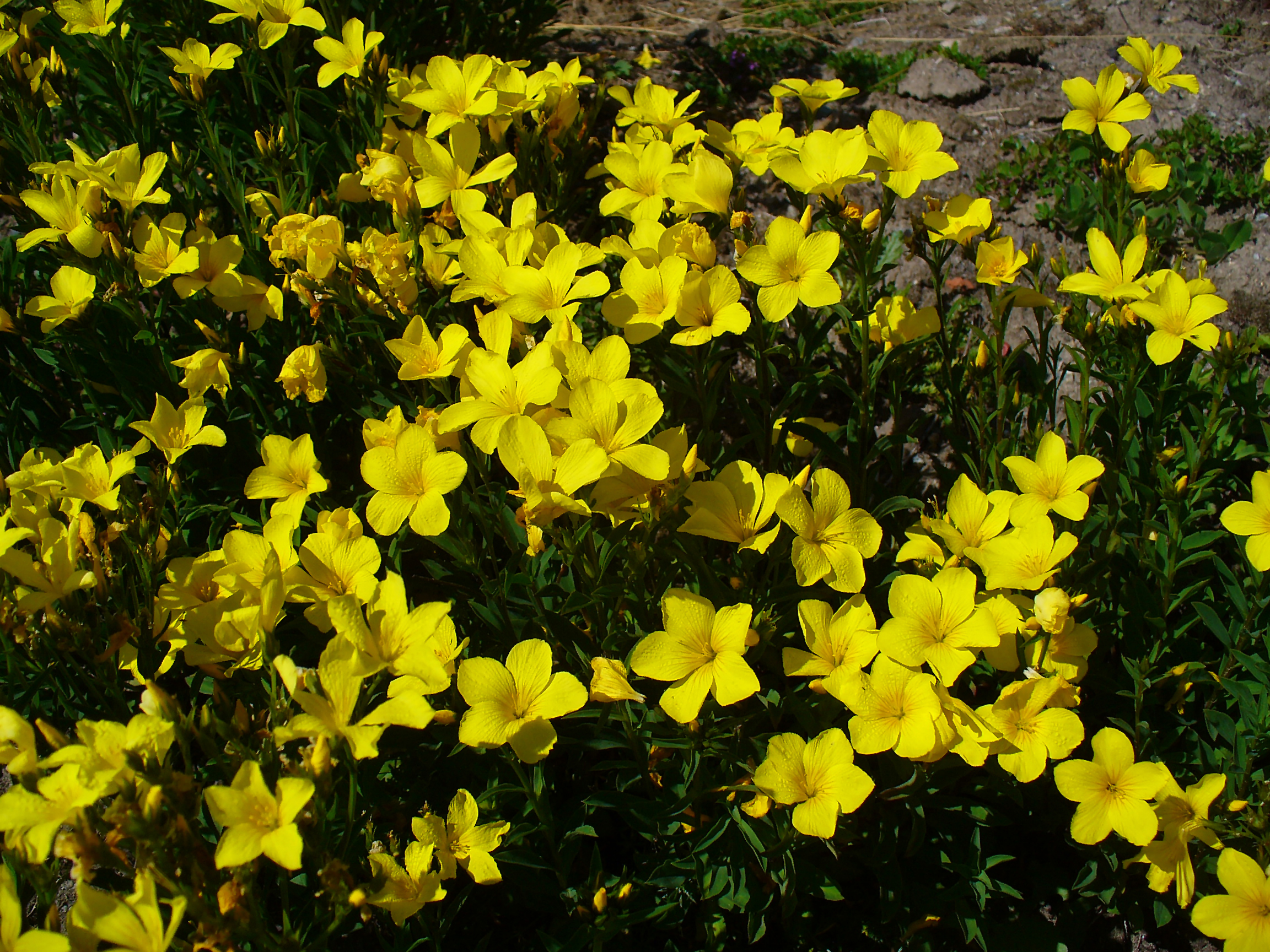

Scientific classification
- Kingdom: Plantae
- Clade: Tracheophytes
- Clade: Angiosperms
- Clade: Eudicots
- Clade: Rosids
- Order: Malpighiales
- Family: Linaceae
- Genus: Linum
- Species: L. flavum

Binomial name
- Linum flavum L.

Synonyms
- Xantholinum flavum (L.) Rchb.

= Linum flavum =

Species of flowering plant

Linum flavum, the golden flax or yellow flax, is a species of flowering plant in the family Linaceae, native to central and southern Europe. It is an erect, woody perennial growing to 30 cm (12 in) tall by 20 cm (8 in) broad, with dark green, semi-evergreen leaves, and terminal clusters of bright yellow, five-petalled flowers in spring. The Latin flavum means "pure yellow".

In cultivation this plant requires sharply drained soil in a sunny position. It is suitable for a rock garden or alpine garden. The cultivar 'Gemmell's Hybrid' has gained the Royal Horticultural Society's Award of Garden Merit.
