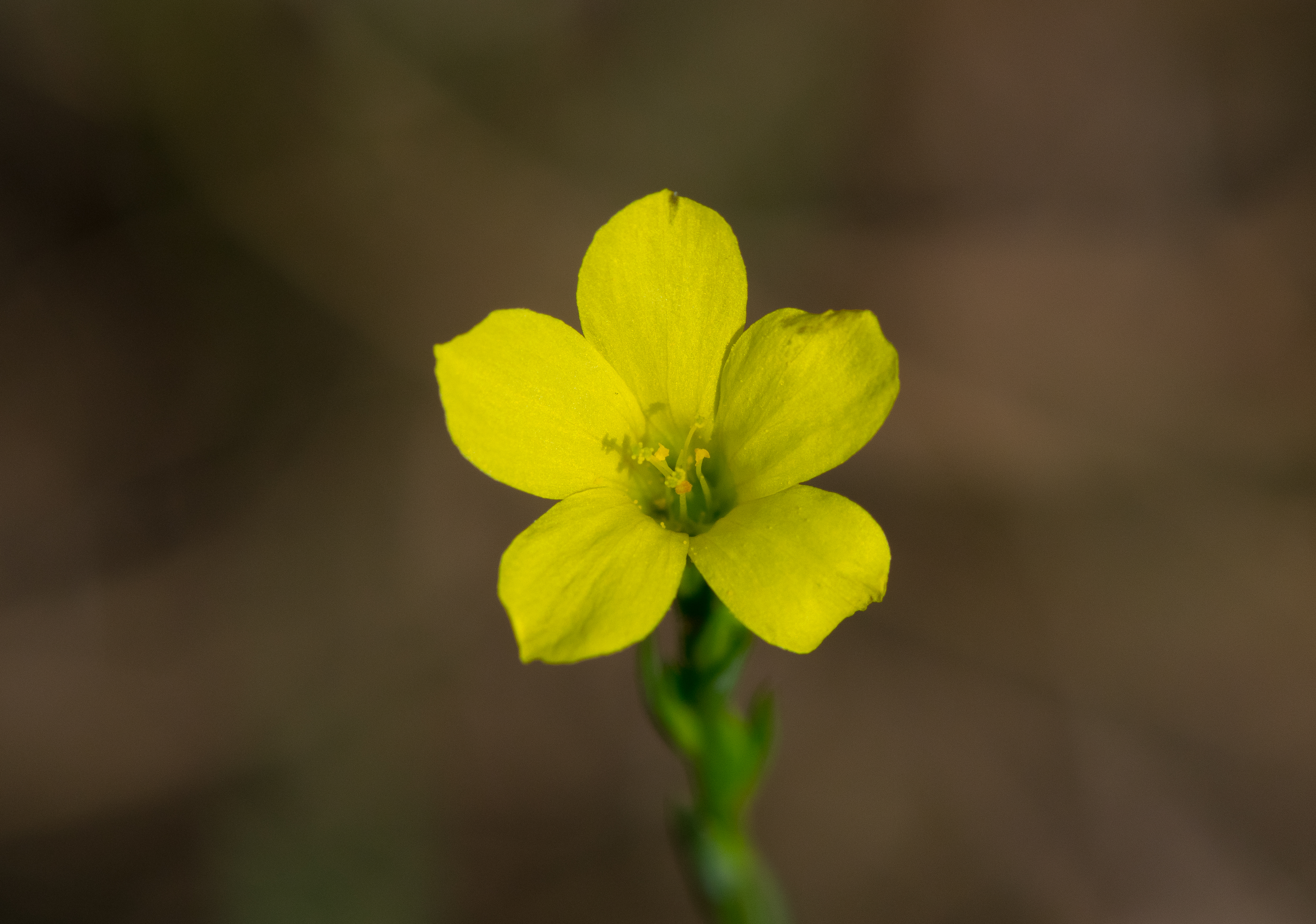

Scientific classification
- Kingdom: Plantae
- Clade: Tracheophytes
- Clade: Angiosperms
- Clade: Eudicots
- Clade: Rosids
- Order: Malpighiales
- Family: Linaceae
- Genus: Linum
- Species: L. sulcatum

Binomial name
- Linum sulcatum Riddell

= Linum sulcatum =

Species of flowering plant

Linum sulcatum, common names yellow flax, grooved yellow flax, grooved flax, and yellow wild flax is a plant native to the United States and Canada.

== Conservation status in the United States ==
It is listed as endangered in Connecticut, as rare in Indiana, as endangered in Maryland, New Jersey, and Pennsylvania, as threatened in New York (state), and as historical in Rhode Island.
