= List of Lamiaceae of South Africa =

List of plants in the mint family recorded from South Africa

Lamiaceae is a family of flowering plants commonly referred to as the ″mint family″. The country of South Africa has 301 accepted taxa belonging to this family, as ennumerated in an annual checklist of all indigenous and naturalised plant species published by the South African National Biodiversity Institute (SANBI).

What follows is a list of Lamiaceae taxa of plants present within the borders of South Africa (excluding the distant Prince Edward Islands) as of March 2026.

== Acrotome ==
Genus Acrotome:

- Acrotome angustifolia G.Taylor, indigenous
- Acrotome hispida Benth., indigenous
- Acrotome inflata Benth., indigenous
- Acrotome pallescens Benth., indigenous
- Acrotome thorncroftii Skan, indigenous

== Aeollanthus ==
Genus Aeollanthus:

- Aeollanthus buchnerianus Briq., indigenous
- Aeollanthus neglectus (Dinter) Launert, indigenous
- Aeollanthus parvifolius Benth., indigenous
- Aeollanthus rehmannii Gurke, indigenous
- Aeollanthus suaveolens Mart. ex Spreng., indigenous

== Ajuga ==
Genus Ajuga:

- Ajuga ophrydis Burch. ex Benth., indigenous

== Basilicum ==
Genus Basilicum:

- Basilicum polystachyon (L.) Moench, indigenous

== Cantinoa ==
Genus Cantinoa:

- Cantinoa americana (Aubl.) Harley & J.F.B.Pastore, naturalised
- Cantinoa mutabilis (Rich.) Harley & J.F.B.Pastore, naturalised

== Cedronella ==
Genus Cedronella:

- Cedronella canariensis (L.) Webb & Berthel., naturalised (invasive)

== Clerodendrum ==
Genus Clerodendrum:

- Clerodendrum africanum Moldenke, endemic
- Clerodendrum bungei Steud., naturalised (invasive)
- Clerodendrum makanjanum H.J.P.Winkl., indigenous
- Clerodendrum pleiosciadium Gurke, indigenous
- Clerodendrum ternatum Schinz, indigenous

== Coleus ==
Genus Coleus:

- Coleus aliciae (Codd) A.J.Paton, endemic
- Coleus amboinicus Lour., indigenous
- Coleus autranii Briq., indigenous
- Coleus barbatus (Andrews) Benth. ex G.Don
  - Coleus barbatus var. grandis (L.H.Cramer) A.J.Paton, naturalised (invasive)
- Coleus bojeri Benth., indigenous
- Coleus calycinus (Benth.) A.J.Paton, endemic
- Coleus caninus (Roth) Vatke
  - Coleus caninus subsp. flavovirens (Gurke) A.J.Paton, indigenous
- Coleus comosus Hochst. ex Gurke, naturalised
- Coleus cylindraceus (Hochst. ex Benth.) A.J.Paton, indigenous
- Coleus dolichopodus (Briq.) A.J.Paton, indigenous
- Coleus esculentus (N.E.Br.) G.Taylor, indigenous
- Coleus gibbosus A.J.Paton, endemic
- Coleus grandidentatus (Gurke) A.J.Paton, indigenous
- Coleus hadiensis (Forssk.) A.J.Paton, indigenous
- Coleus hereroensis (Engl.) A.J.Paton, indigenous
- Coleus kirkii (Baker) A.J.Paton, indigenous
- Coleus lasianthus Gurke, indigenous
- Coleus leemannii (N.Hahn) A.J.Paton, endemic
- Coleus livingstonei A.J.Paton, indigenous
- Coleus madagascariensis (Pers.) A.Chev., indigenous
- Coleus mutabilis (Codd) A.J.Paton, endemic
- Coleus neochilus (Schltr.) Codd, indigenous
- Coleus pentheri Gurke, indigenous
- Coleus porcatus (Van Jaarsv. & P.J.D.Winter) A.J.Paton, endemic
- Coleus psammophilus (Codd) A.J.Paton, indigenous
- Coleus pyramidatus (Gürke) K.Balkwill, endemic
- Coleus rotundifolius (Poir.) A.Chev. & Perrot, indigenous
- Coleus subspicatus (Hochst.) Walp., indigenous
- Coleus tetragonus (Gurke) Robyns & Lebrun, indigenous
- Coleus venteri (Van Jaarsv. & Hankey) A.J.Paton, indigenous
- Coleus xerophilus (Codd) A.J.Paton, endemic

== Endostemon ==
Genus Endostemon:

- Endostemon obtusifolius (E.Mey. ex Benth.) N.E.Br., indigenous
- Endostemon tenuiflorus (Benth.) M.Ashby, indigenous
- Endostemon tereticaulis (Poir.) M.Ashby, indigenous

== Equilabium ==
Genus Equilabium:

- Equilabium dolomiticum (Codd) Mwany. & A.J.Paton, endemic
- Equilabium laxiflorum (Benth.) Mwany., A.J.Paton & Culham, indigenous
- Equilabium petiolare (Benth.) Mwany. & A.J.Paton, endemic
- Equilabium regale C.J.Fourie & Hankey, endemic

== Hoslundia ==
Genus Hoslundia:

- Hoslundia opposita Vahl, indigenous

== Kalaharia ==
Genus Kalaharia:

- Kalaharia uncinata (Schinz) Moldenke, indigenous

== Karomia ==
Genus Karomia:

- Karomia speciosa (Hutch. & Corbishley) R.Fern.
  - Karomia speciosa forma speciosa, indigenous
  - Karomia speciosa forma flava (Moldenke) R.Fern., indigenous

== Killickia ==
Genus Killickia:

- Killickia compacta (Killick) Brauchler, Heubl & Doroszenko, endemic
- Killickia grandiflora (Killick) Brauchler, Heubl & Doroszenko, endemic
- Killickia lutea Brauchler, endemic
- Killickia pilosa (Benth.) Brauchler, Heubl & Doroszenko, endemic

== Lamium ==
Genus Lamium:

- Lamium amplexicaule L., naturalised (invasive)
- Lamium galeobdolon Crantz, naturalised

== Leonotis ==
Genus Leonotis:

- Leonotis leonurus (L.) R.Br. indigenous
- Leonotis nepetifolia (L.) R.Br. indigenous
- Leonotis ocymifolia (Burm.f.) Iwarsson
  - Leonotis ocymifolia var. raineriana (Vis.) Iwarsson, indigenous
  - Leonotis ocymifolia var. schinzii (Gurke) Iwarsson, indigenous

== Leucas ==
Genus Leucas:

- Leucas capensis (Benth.) Engl. accepted as Leonotis pentadentata J.C.Manning & Goldblatt, indigenous
- Leucas ebracteata Peyr. var. kaokoveldensis Sebald, accepted as Leonotis ebracteata (Peyr.) J.C.Manning & Goldblatt var. kaokoveldensis (Sebald) J.C.Manning & Goldb
  - Leucas glabrata (Vahl) Sm. accepted as Leonotis glabrata (Vahl) J.C.Manning & Goldblatt, present
  - Leucas glabrata (Vahl) Sm. var. glabrata, accepted as Leonotis glabrata (Vahl) J.C.Manning & Goldblatt var. glabrata, indigenous
  - Leucas glabrata (Vahl) Sm. var. linearis Codd, accepted as Leonotis glabrata (Vahl) J.C.Manning & Goldblatt var. linearis (Codd) J.C.Manning & Goldblatt, endemic
- Leucas lavandulifolia Sm., naturalised (invasive)
- Leucas martinicensis (Jacq.) R.Br. accepted as Leonotis martinicensis (Jacq.) J.C.Manning & Goldblatt, indigenous
- Leucas neuflizeana Courbon, accepted as Leonotis neuflizeana (Courbon) J.C.Manning & Goldblatt, indigenous
- Leucas pechuelii (Kuntze) Gurke, accepted as Leonotis pechuelii (Kuntze) J.C.Manning & Goldblatt
- Leucas sexdentata Skan, accepted as Leonotis sexdentata (Skan) J.C.Manning & Goldblatt, indigenous

== Marrubium ==
Genus Marrubium:

- Marrubium vulgare L., naturalised

== Mentha ==
Genus Mentha:

- Mentha aquatica L., indigenous
- Mentha longifolia (L.) Huds.
  - Mentha longifolia subsp. capensis (Thunb.) Briq., indigenous
  - Mentha longifolia subsp. polyadena (Briq.) Briq., endemic
  - Mentha longifolia subsp. wissii (Launert) Codd, endemic
- Mentha pulegium L., naturalised (invasive)

== Mesosphaerum ==
Genus Mesosphaerum:

- Mesosphaerum pectinatum (L.) Kuntze, naturalised

== Micromeria ==
Genus Micromeria:

- Micromeria imbricata (Forssk.) C.Chr.
  - Micromeria imbricata var. imbricata, indigenous

== Ocimum ==
Genus Ocimum:

- Ocimum x africanum Lour., indigenous
- Ocimum americanum L., indigenous
- Ocimum angustifolium Benth., indigenous
- Ocimum burchellianum Benth., endemic
- Ocimum coddii (S.D.Will. & K.Balkwill) A.J.Paton, endemic
- Ocimum dolomiticola A.J.Paton, indigenous
- Ocimum filamentosum Forssk., indigenous
- Ocimum gratissimum L.
  - Ocimum gratissimum subsp. gratissimum var. gratissimum, indigenous
- Ocimum labiatum (N.E.Br.) A.J.Paton, indigenous
- Ocimum motjaneanum McCallum & K.Balkwill, indigenous
- Ocimum natalense Ayob. ex A.J.Paton, indigenous
- Ocimum obovatum E.Mey. ex Benth.
  - Ocimum obovatum subsp. obovatum var. obovatum, indigenous
  - Ocimum obovatum subsp. obovatum var. galpinii (Gurke) A.J.Paton, indigenous
- Ocimum pseudoserratum (M.Ashby) A.J.Paton, endemic
- Ocimum reclinatum (S.D.Will. & K.Balkwill) A.J.Paton, endemic
- Ocimum serratum (Schltr.) A.J.Paton, indigenous
- Ocimum tubiforme (R.D.Good) A.J.Paton, endemic
- Ocimum waterbergense (S.D.Will. & K.Balkwill) A.J.Paton, endemic

== Orthosiphon ==
Genus Orthosiphon:

- Orthosiphon fruticosus Codd, endemic
- Orthosiphon schimperi Benth., indigenous
- Orthosiphon thymiflorus (Roth) Sleesen, indigenous

== Platostoma ==
Genus Platostoma:

- Platostoma rotundifolium (Briq.) A.J.Paton, indigenous

== Plectranthus ==
Genus Plectranthus:

- Plectranthus ambiguus (Bolus) Codd, indigenous
- Plectranthus brevimentum T.J.Edwards, endemic
- Plectranthus ciliatus E.Mey. ex Benth., indigenous
- Plectranthus ecklonii Benth., endemic
- Plectranthus elegantulus Briq., endemic
- Plectranthus ernstii Codd, endemic
- Plectranthus fruticosus L'Her., indigenous
- Plectranthus grallatus Briq., indigenous
- Plectranthus hilliardiae Codd
  - Plectranthus hilliardiae subsp. hilliardiae, indigenous
  - Plectranthus hilliardiae subsp. australis Van Jaarsv. & A.E.van Wyk, indigenous
- Plectranthus lucidus Van Jaarsv. & T.J.Edwards, endemic
- Plectranthus malvinus Van Jaarsv. & T.J.Edwards, endemic
- Plectranthus mzimvubensis Van Jaarsv., endemic
- Plectranthus neochilus Schltr., indigenous
- Plectranthus oertendahlii T.C.E.Fr., endemic
- Plectranthus oribiensis Codd, endemic
- Plectranthus praetermissus Codd, endemic
- Plectranthus purpuratus Harv.
  - Plectranthus purpuratus subsp. purpuratus, indigenous
  - Plectranthus purpuratus subsp. montanus Van Jaarsv. & T.J.Edwards
  - Plectranthus purpuratus subsp. tongaensis Van Jaarsv. & T.J.Edwards, endemic
- Plectranthus reflexus Van Jaarsv. & T.J.Edwards, endemic
- Plectranthus rubropunctatus Codd, indigenous
- Plectranthus saccatus Benth.
  - Plectranthus saccatus var. saccatus, endemic
  - Plectranthus saccatus var. longitubus Codd, endemic
  - Plectranthus saccatus subsp. pondoensis Van Jaarsv. & Milstein, endemic
- Plectranthus strigosus Benth., indigenous
- Plectranthus stylesii T.J.Edwards, endemic
- Plectranthus swynnertonii S.Moore, indigenous
- Plectranthus verticillatus (L.f.) Druce, indigenous
- Plectranthus zuluensis T.Cooke, indigenous

== Premna ==
Genus Premna:

- Premna mooiensis (H.Pearson) W.Piep., indigenous

== Prunella ==
Genus Prunella:

- Prunella vulgaris L., naturalised (invasive)

== Pseudodictamnus ==
Genus Pseudodictamnus:

- Pseudodictamnus africanus (L.) Salmaki & Siadati, indigenous

== Rotheca ==
Genus Rotheca:

- Rotheca caerulea (N.E.Br.) P.P.J.Herman & Retief, endemic
- Rotheca cuneiformis (Moldenke) P.P.J.Herman & Retief, endemic
- Rotheca hirsuta (Hochst.) R.Fern.
  - Rotheca hirsuta forma hirsuta, indigenous
  - Rotheca hirsuta forma triphylla (Harv.) Fernald, indigenous
- Rotheca louwalbertsii (P.P.J.Herman) P.P.J.Herman & Retief, indigenous
- Rotheca myricoides (Hochst.) Steane & Mabb.
  - Rotheca myricoides subsp. myricoides var. myricoides, indigenous
- Rotheca pilosa (H.Pearson) P.P.J.Herman & Retief, endemic
- Rotheca suffuticosa (Gurke) Verdc., indigenous
- Rotheca violacea (Gurke) Verdc., indigenous
- Rotheca wildii (Moldenke) R.Fern.
  - Rotheca wildii forma glabra (R.Fern.) R.Fern., indigenous

== Salvia ==
Genus Salvia:

- Salvia africana L., endemic
- Salvia albicaulis Benth., endemic
- Salvia aurea L., endemic
- Salvia aurita L.f.
  - Salvia aurita var. aurita, endemic
  - Salvia aurita var. galpinii (Skan) Hedge, indigenous
- Salvia chamelaeagnea P.J.Bergius, endemic
- Salvia coccinea Etl., naturalised
- Salvia dentata Aiton, indigenous
- Salvia disermas L., indigenous
- Salvia dolomitica Codd, endemic
- Salvia garipensis E.Mey. ex Benth. = Salvia gariepensis sensu POWO (orth. var.), indigenous
- Salvia granitica Hochst., endemic
- Salvia lanceolata Lam., indigenous
- Salvia muirii L.Bolus, endemic
- Salvia namaensis Schinz, indigenous
- Salvia obtusata Thunb., endemic
- Salvia radula Benth., indigenous
- Salvia reflexa Hornem., naturalised (invasive)
- Salvia repens Burch. ex Benth.
  - Salvia repens var. keiensis Hedge, endemic
  - Salvia repens var. repens, indigenous
  - Salvia repens var. transvaalensis Hedge, indigenous
- Salvia runcinata L.f., indigenous
- Salvia scabra L.f., endemic
- Salvia schlechteri Briq., endemic
- Salvia sclarea L., naturalised (invasive)
- Salvia stenophylla Burch. ex Benth., indigenous
- Salvia thermarum Van Jaarsv., endemic
- Salvia tiliifolia Vahl, naturalised (invasive)
- Salvia triangularis Thunb., endemic
- Salvia tysonii Skan, endemic
- Salvia verbenaca L., naturalised (invasive)

== Satureja ==
Genus Satureja:

- Satureja thymbra L., naturalised

== Scutellaria ==
Genus Scutellaria:

- Scutellaria racemosa Pers., naturalised (invasive)

== Stachys ==
Genus Stachys:

- Stachys aethiopica L., indigenous
- Stachys afra E.Mey. ex Benth., endemic
- Stachys albiflora N.E.Br., endemic
- Stachys arachnoidea Codd, indigenous
- Stachys arvensis L., naturalised
- Stachys aurea Benth., indigenous
- Stachys bolusii Skan, endemic
- Stachys burchelliana Launert, indigenous
- Stachys comosa Codd, endemic
- Stachys cuneata Banks ex Benth., endemic
- Stachys cymbalaria Briq., endemic
- Stachys dregeana Benth., indigenous
- Stachys erectiuscula Gurke, endemic
- Stachys flavescens Benth., endemic
- Stachys flexuosa Skan, endemic
- Stachys graciliflora C.Presl, indigenous
- Stachys grandifolia E.Mey. ex Benth., indigenous
- Stachys humifusa Burch. ex Benth., endemic
- Stachys hyssopoides Burch. ex Benth., endemic
- Stachys kuntzei Gurke, indigenous
- Stachys lallaniana R.Kr.Singh & Sanjeet Kumar, endemic
- Stachys lamarckii Benth., indigenous
- Stachys linearis Burch. ex Benth., indigenous
- Stachys natalensis Hochst.
  - Stachys natalensis var. natalensis, indigenous
  - Stachys natalensis var. galpinii (Briq.) Codd, indigenous
- Stachys nigricans Benth., indigenous
- Stachys obtusifolia MacOwan, endemic
- Stachys rehmannii Skan, endemic
- Stachys reticulata Codd, endemic
- Stachys rivularis J.M.Wood & M.S.Evans, endemic
- Stachys rudatisii Skan, endemic
- Stachys rugosa Aiton, indigenous
- Stachys scabrida Skan, endemic
- Stachys sessilifolia E.Mey. ex Benth., endemic
- Stachys sessilis Gurke, indigenous
- Stachys simplex Schltr., indigenous
- Stachys spathulata Burch. ex Benth., indigenous
- Stachys sublobata Skan, endemic
- Stachys thunbergii Benth., endemic
- Stachys tubulosa MacOwan, indigenous
- Stachys tysonii Skan, indigenous
- Stachys zeyheri Skan, endemic

== Syncolostemon ==
Genus Syncolostemon:

- Syncolostemon albiflorus (N.E.Br.) D.F.Otieno, indigenous
- Syncolostemon argenteus N.E.Br., endemic
- Syncolostemon aurulentus Ngwenya, endemic
- Syncolostemon bolusii (N.E.Br.) D.F.Otieno, endemic
- Syncolostemon bracteosus (Benth.) D.F.Otieno
  - Syncolostemon bracteosus var. bracteosus, indigenous
- Syncolostemon canescens (Gurke) D.F.Otieno, indigenous
- Syncolostemon cinereus (Codd) D.F.Otieno & Retief, endemic
- Syncolostemon concinnus N.E.Br., indigenous
- Syncolostemon densiflorus Benth., endemic
- Syncolostemon elliottii (Baker) D.F.Otieno, indigenous
- Syncolostemon eriocephalus I.Verd., endemic
- Syncolostemon foliosus (S.Moore) D.F.Otieno, indigenous
- Syncolostemon gerrardii (N.E.Br.) D.F.Otieno, endemic
- Syncolostemon heterophyllus (Gurke) K.Balkwill, endemic
- Syncolostemon incanus (Codd) D.F.Otieno, endemic
- Syncolostemon latidens (N.E.Br.) Codd, endemic
- Syncolostemon linearis (Benth.) D.F.Otieno, indigenous
- Syncolostemon macranthus (Gurke) M.Ashby, endemic
- Syncolostemon macrophyllus Gurke, endemic
- Syncolostemon modestus (Codd) D.F.Otieno, indigenous
- Syncolostemon muddii (N.E.Br.) K.Balkwill, endemic
- Syncolostemon ngwenyi K.Balkwill, endemic
- Syncolostemon obermeyerae (M.Ashby) D.F.Otieno, endemic
- Syncolostemon parviflorus E.Mey. ex Benth.
  - Syncolostemon parviflorus var. lanceolatus (Gurke) Codd, indigenous
  - Syncolostemon parviflorus var. parviflorus, indigenous
- Syncolostemon parvifolius (Codd) D.F.Otieno, endemic
- Syncolostemon persimilis (N.E.Br.) D.F.Otieno, endemic
- Syncolostemon petiolatus (M.Ashby) D.F.Otieno, indigenous
- Syncolostemon pretoriae (Gurke) D.F.Otieno
  - Syncolostemon pretoriae var. longitubus K.Balkwill, endemic
  - Syncolostemon pretoriae var. pretoriae, indigenous
- Syncolostemon punctatus (Codd) D.F.Otieno, endemic
- Syncolostemon qudeniensis D.F.Otieno, endemic
- Syncolostemon ramosus (Codd) D.F.Otieno, endemic
- Syncolostemon ramulosus E.Mey. ex Benth., endemic
- Syncolostemon rectiflorus K.Balkwill, endemic
- Syncolostemon rehmannii (Gurke) D.F.Otieno, endemic
- Syncolostemon rotundifolius E.Mey. ex Benth., endemic
- Syncolostemon rugosifolius (M.Ashby) D.F.Otieno, endemic
- Syncolostemon stalmansii (A.J.Paton & K.Balkwill) D.F.Otieno, indigenous
- Syncolostemon stenophyllus (Gurke) D.F.Otieno, endemic
- Syncolostemon subvelutinus (Gurke) D.F.Otieno, endemic
- Syncolostemon teucriifolius (Hochst.) D.F.Otieno, indigenous
- Syncolostemon thorncroftii (N.E.Br.) D.F.Otieno, indigenous
- Syncolostemon transvaalensis (Schltr.) D.F.Otieno, endemic

== Tetradenia ==
Genus Tetradenia:

- Tetradenia bainesii (N.E.Br.) Phillipson & C.F.Steyn, indigenous
- Tetradenia barberae (N.E.Br.) Codd, endemic
- Tetradenia brevispicata (N.E.Br.) Codd, indigenous
- Tetradenia galpinii (N.E.Br.) Phillipson & C.F.Steyn, indigenous
- Tetradenia riparia (Hochst.) Codd, indigenous
- Tetradenia tuberosa T.J.Edwards, endemic

== Teucrium ==
Genus Teucrium:

- Teucrium africanum Thunb., endemic
- Teucrium kraussii Codd, indigenous
- Teucrium trifidum Retz., indigenous

== Thorncroftia ==
Genus Thorncroftia:

- Thorncroftia coddii Changwe & K.Balkwill, endemic
- Thorncroftia greenii Changwe & K.Balkwill, endemic
- Thorncroftia longiflora N.E.Br., indigenous
- Thorncroftia lotteri T.J.Edwards, endemic
- Thorncroftia media Codd, endemic
- Thorncroftia succulenta (R.A.Dyer & E.A.Bruce) Codd, endemic
- Thorncroftia thorncroftii (S.Moore) Codd, indigenous

== Tinnea ==
Genus Tinnea:

- Tinnea barbata Vollesen, indigenous
- Tinnea galpinii Briq., indigenous
- Tinnea rhodesiana S.Moore, indigenous

== Vitex ==
Genus Vitex:

- Vitex ferruginea Schumach. & Thonn., indigenous
- Vitex harveyana H.Pearson, indigenous
- Vitex obovata E.Mey.
  - Vitex obovata subsp. obovata, indigenous
  - Vitex obovata subsp. wilmsii (Gurke) Bredenk. & D.J.Botha, indigenous
- Vitex patula E.A.Bruce, indigenous
- Vitex pooara Corbishley, endemic
- Vitex rehmannii Gurke, indigenous
- Vitex trifolia L., naturalised (invasive)
- Vitex zeyheri Sond., indigenous

== Volkameria ==
Genus Volkameria:

- Volkameria glabra (E.Mey.) Mabb. & Y.W.Yuan, indigenous
