= Stachys arachnoidea =

Conservation status
- Least Concern (SANBI Red List)

Scientific classification
- Kingdom: Plantae
- Clade: Embryophytes
- Clade: Tracheophytes
- Clade: Spermatophytes
- Clade: Angiosperms
- Clade: Eudicots
- Clade: Asterids
- Order: Lamiales
- Family: Lamiaceae
- Genus: Stachys
- Species: S. arachnoidea

Binomial name
- Stachys arachnoidea Codd

Species of shrub

Stachys arachnoidea, the cobwebbed woundwort, is a species of hedgenettle found in South Africa and Eswatini.

== Description ==
This species is a perennial herb with creeping to weakly climbing stems that branch freely and can reach up to 1 m (3.3 ft) in length. The stems are densely covered with soft white hairs.

The leaves are almost stalkless or borne on short stalks. They are thin, broadly ovate to nearly round, 18–40 mm (0.71–1.57 in) long, and distinctly discolorous: the upper surface is greenish to brown and lightly to fairly densely hairy, while the underside is covered with a dense, white, web-like layer of hairs and dotted with tiny yellowish glands. The leaves have a rounded to blunt tip, a heart-shaped base, and shallowly scalloped margins.

The flowers are arranged in a loose inflorescence, with two flowers per whorl and leaf-like bracts. The calyx is densely white and woolly. The corolla is white, with a mauve-purple upper lip and a speckled lower lip; the lower lip is notably longer and held horizontally.

=== Identification ===
Stachys arachnoidea can be confused with other procumbent species with two-flowered verticils, especially Stachys natalensis and Stachys rehmannii. It does not overlap with another example, Stachys rudatisii, geographically. It differs from these in its markedly discolorous leaves, with the undersides being white with a cobwebby tomentum.

== Distribution and habitat ==
Stachys arachnoidea is found on the mountains of South Africa's Limpopo and Mpumalanga provinces and in northern Eswatini at altitudes of 1,300–2,000 m (4,300–6,600 ft). It prefers damp places on grassy slopes and in forest margins.

== See also ==
- List of Lamiaceae of South Africa
