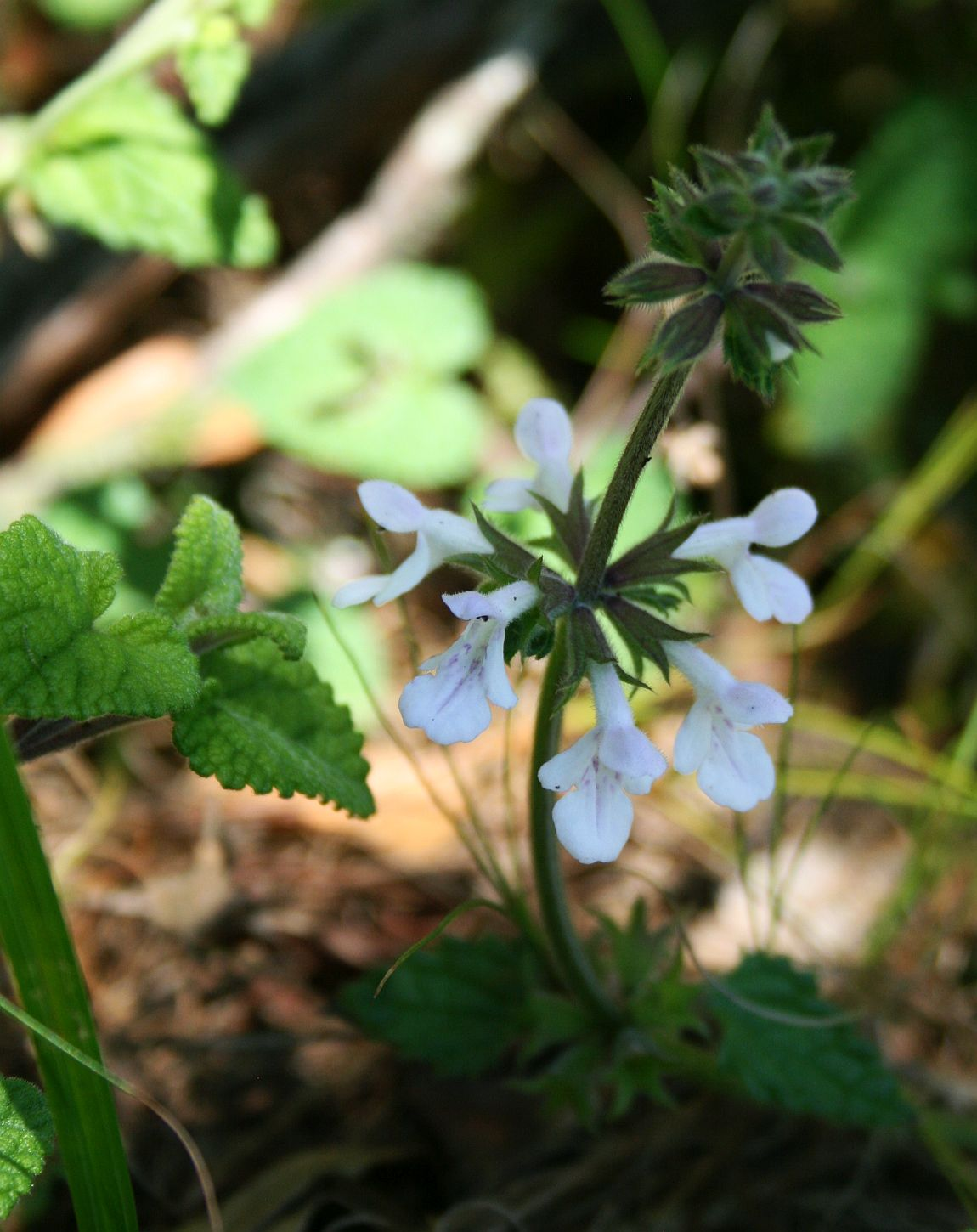

Conservation status
- Least Concern (SANBI Red List)

Scientific classification
- Kingdom: Plantae
- Clade: Embryophytes
- Clade: Tracheophytes
- Clade: Spermatophytes
- Clade: Angiosperms
- Clade: Eudicots
- Clade: Asterids
- Order: Lamiales
- Family: Lamiaceae
- Genus: Stachys
- Species: S. reticulata

Binomial name
- Stachys reticulata Codd

= Stachys reticulata =

Species of shrub

Stachys reticulata, the Pilgrim's Rest woundwort, is a species of hedgenettle endemic to South Africa's Mpumalanga province.

== Description ==
This species is a perennial herb with creeping to spreading stems that branch freely and can reach up to 60 cm (24 in) in length. The stems are densely covered with soft hairs.

The leaves are borne on short stalks and have fairly firm, broadly ovate to almost kidney-shaped blades, 10–30 mm (0.39–1.18 in) long. The upper surface is brownish and bristly, while the underside is paler, covered in dense hairs, dotted with glands, and shows a net-like pattern of veins. The leaves have a rounded to slightly pointed tip, a broadly heart-shaped base, and shallowly scalloped margins.

The flowers are arranged in a loose inflorescence of two to four whorls, sometimes forming a short cluster. Each whorl bears four to six flowers. The calyx is moderately hairy and glandular. The corolla is white to pale mauve, with a short tube and two lips, the lower lip longer and curved downward.

=== Identification ===
Stachys reticulata can be confused with other members of the so-called Stachys aethiopica Complex. From Stachys natalensis, it can be distinguished by its 4–6-flowered whorls, against the latter's two. Its spreading calyx teeth and net-like pattern of veins on the underside of the leaves help separate it from Stachys aethiopica, while in Stachys rehmannii the hairs are stellate, not simple.

== Distribution and habitat ==
Stachys reticulata grows among rocks in mountain grassland in the mountains of Mpumalanga at altitudes of 1,500–2,200 m (4,900–7,200 ft). As its English-language common name suggests, records of the plant centre on the village of Pilgrim's Rest.

== See also ==
- List of Lamiaceae of South Africa
