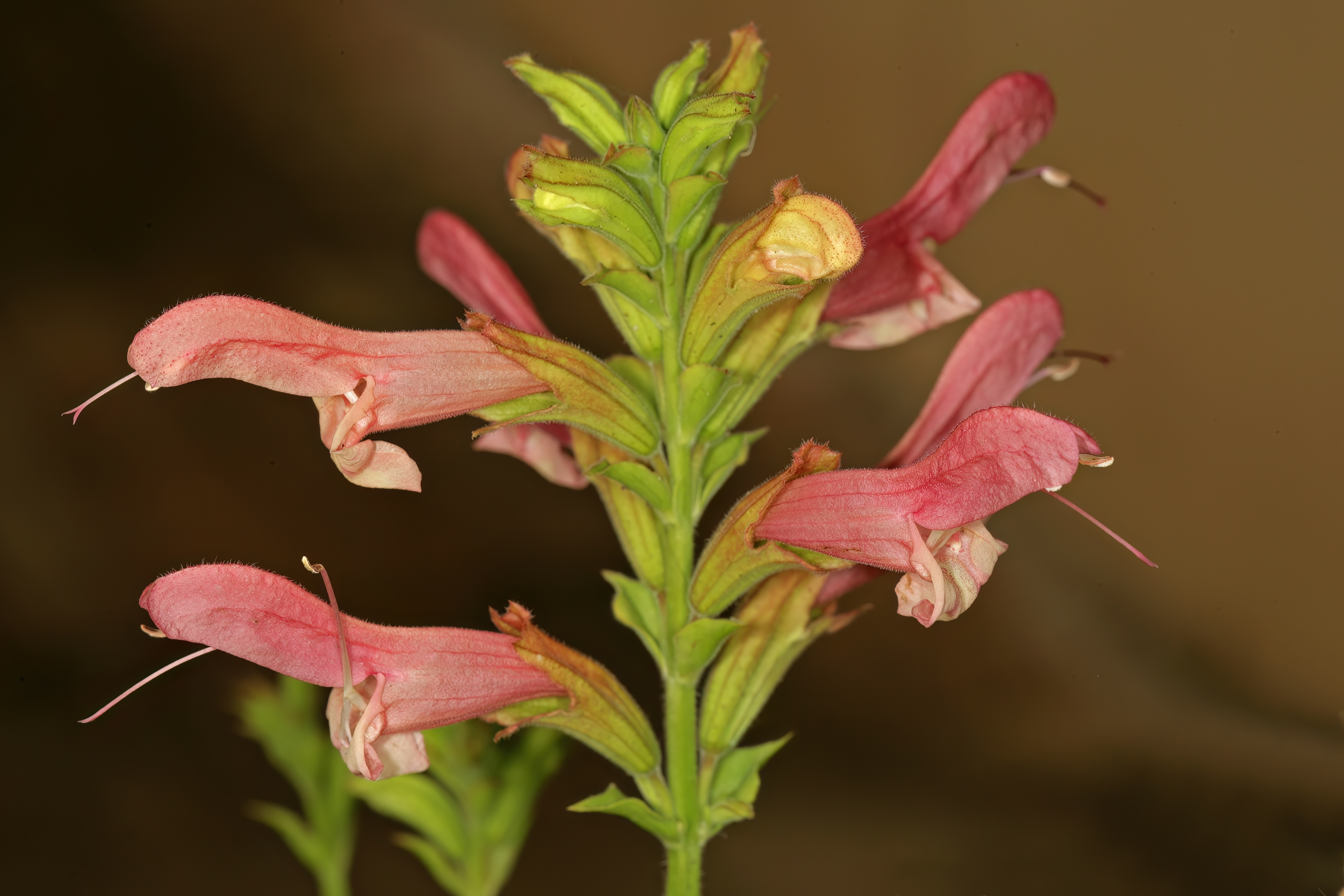

Conservation status
- Vulnerable (SANBI Red List)

Scientific classification
- Kingdom: Plantae
- Clade: Tracheophytes
- Clade: Angiosperms
- Clade: Eudicots
- Clade: Asterids
- Order: Lamiales
- Family: Lamiaceae
- Genus: Salvia
- Species: S. thermarum

Binomial name
- Salvia thermarum van Jaarsv.

= Salvia thermarum =

Species of flowering plant

Salvia thermarum (Goudini sage) is a perennial native to South Africa, discovered in 1998 by Ernst van Jaarsveld of Cape Town's Kirstenbosch National Botanical Garden. The common name is based on the location of the plant's discovery, near Goudini Spa, approximately 120 km from Cape Town—the specific epithet, thermarum, refers to the thermal baths where it was found. It is only found native in the Cape Provinces.

Salvia thermarum is an erect plant that grows up to 1 m (3.3 ft) high from a stoloniferous base. The dark green stems have glandular hairs when young, getting smooth with age. The leaves are dark green with purplish tips, reaching 20 to 35 mm (0.79 to 1.38 in) long by 15 mm (0.59 in) wide. The 40 to 55 mm (1.6 to 2.2 in) long pale red to deep salmon flowers grow in whorls and have red bracts. The plant is easily confused with the closely related Salvia granitica.

== See also ==
- List of Lamiaceae of South Africa
