= Salvia rotundifolia =

Salvia rotundifolia can refer to the following plant species:

- Salvia rotundifolia Salisb., a synonym of Salvia africana L.
- Salvia rotundifolia Vis., a synonym of Salvia tomentosa Mill.
