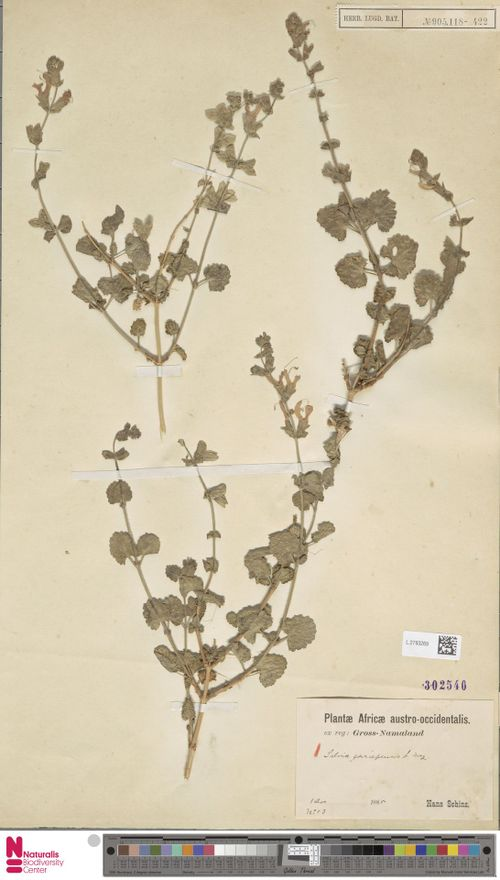
- Salvia garipensis, collected in South Africa by the Naturalis Biodiversity Center

Conservation status
- Least Concern (SANBI Red List)

Scientific classification
- Kingdom: Plantae
- Clade: Embryophytes
- Clade: Tracheophytes
- Clade: Spermatophytes
- Clade: Angiosperms
- Clade: Eudicots
- Clade: Asterids
- Order: Lamiales
- Family: Lamiaceae
- Genus: Salvia
- Species: S. garipensis

Binomial name
- Salvia garipensis E.Mey. ex Benth.

Synonyms
- Salvia dinteri Briq.; Salvia steingroeveri Briq.

= Salvia garipensis =

Species of shrub

Salvia garipensis is a species of sage, commonly called Gariep sage. It is native to Namibia and South Africa′s Northern Cape province, where it grows on well-drained stony slopes and along water courses at 630–2200 m in altitude.

The epithet garipensis has its origins in the Khoekhoegowab word for ″river″ as applied to the Orange River, which forms a border between South Africa and Namibia. Its spelling has been treated inconsistently in the literature. While some global databases (e.g. Plants of the World Online) adopt gariepensis as a corrected form, South African floristic works (including Flora Capensis, vol. 5, 1912) and several nomenclatural sources retain the original published spelling garipensis E.Mey. ex Benth..

This species is most closely related to the South African species Salvia chamelaeagnea and Salvia albicaulis, as well as the eastern Mediterranean's Salvia dominica.

== Description ==
It is a much-branched shrub growing to about 1–2 m (3 ft 3 in – 6 ft 7 in) in height. The stems are quadrangular and may be woody or herbaceous. They are covered in a mixture of long, spreading, non-glandular hairs, shorter glandular hairs, and oil globules, giving the surface a glandular-pubescent texture.

The leaves are highly variable in shape, ranging from oblong to broadly ovate or triangular. They are simple, 1.2–4.5 cm (0.47–1.77 in) long and 1–3 cm (0.39–1.18 in) wide, with irregularly eroded to toothed margins. The leaf base may be truncate, heart-shaped, or rounded. Both glandular and non-glandular hairs are present on the leaves, along with oil globules. The petiole is up to 1.5 cm (0.59 in) long.

The flowers are arranged in whorls, with up to ten of them per inflorescence, each bearing two to four flowers. The whorls are spaced up to about 1.5 cm (0.59 in) apart on the lower part of the inflorescence and become more closely packed towards the top. The floral leaves are broadly ovate, tapering to a point, and persist after flowering; bracts are present. Flower stalks are up to 4 mm (0.16 in) long and spread outward or slightly upward.

The calyx is bell-shaped, 10–12 mm (0.39–0.47 in) long, and expands to about 16 mm (0.63 in) as the fruit develops. It has 13 veins and is glandular-pubescent, with long non-glandular hairs and shorter glandular hairs. The lips of the calyx spread widely; the upper lip is recurved and three-toothed, with the central tooth shorter than the lateral ones, while the lower lip has two narrow, ovate, sharply pointed teeth about 4 mm (0.16 in) long.

The corolla is white, pale blue, or light mauve, usually under 25 mm (0.98 in) long. The upper lip is curved, while the lower lip is about the same length as, or slightly shorter than, the upper lip. The floral tube is slightly swollen and constricted, with a small internal ring.

The staminal connectives are about 14 mm (0.55 in) long, with filaments approximately 4–5 mm (0.16–0.20 in) long. The lower pollen sacs are sterile, axe-shaped, and fused to each other.

The fruit consists of slightly three-angled nutlets, about 2.5 mm × 2 mm (0.098 in × 0.079 in) in size, which become mucilaginous when wet.

Salvia garipensis flowers from May to February.
