= Stachys aurea =

Conservation status
- Least Concern (SANBI Red List)

Scientific classification
- Kingdom: Plantae
- Clade: Embryophytes
- Clade: Tracheophytes
- Clade: Spermatophytes
- Clade: Angiosperms
- Clade: Eudicots
- Clade: Asterids
- Order: Lamiales
- Family: Lamiaceae
- Genus: Stachys
- Species: S. aurea

Binomial name
- Stachys aurea Benth.

Synonyms
- Betonica heraclea L.; Phlomis parvifolia Burch.; Sideritis plumosa Thunb.; Stachys hantamensis Vatke; Stachys integrifolia Vahl ex Benth.; Stachys teres Skan

Species of flowering plant

Stachys aurea, the golden woundwort, is a species of hedgenettle endemic to South Africa.

== Description ==
This species is a freely branched shrub 0.3–1 m (1 ft 0 in – 3 ft 3 in) tall, with spreading to ascending branches that are densely covered in yellowish-white stellate hairs.

The leaves are small, subsessile or borne on short stalks, with thin-textured green blades that are obovate to narrowly elliptic, 10–20 mm (0.39–0.79 in) long. Both surfaces are sparsely to densely stellate-hairy, sometimes nearly hairless above. The tips are acute to blunt, the bases wedge-shaped, and the margins entire or with a few teeth near the apex.

The flowers are produced at the ends of slender branches in few to several whorls, each bearing four to six flowers. The bracts resemble the leaves and are stellate-hairy. The calyx is densely yellowish and woolly, 6–9 mm (0.24–0.35 in) long. The corolla is yellow, with a short tube, an ascending upper lip, and a downward-curving lower lip.

Stachys aurea flowers from September to February.

=== Identification ===
This species can be distinguished from other Stachys within its range by its green leaves and the yellow-tinged woolly surface of its calyces.

== Distribution and habitat ==
Stachys aurea is found on clay or sandy slopes in the south-western Great Karoo – especially the Tankwa and the Roggeveld Mountains – to Pakhuis and southern Namaqualand.

== See also ==
- List of Lamiaceae of South Africa
