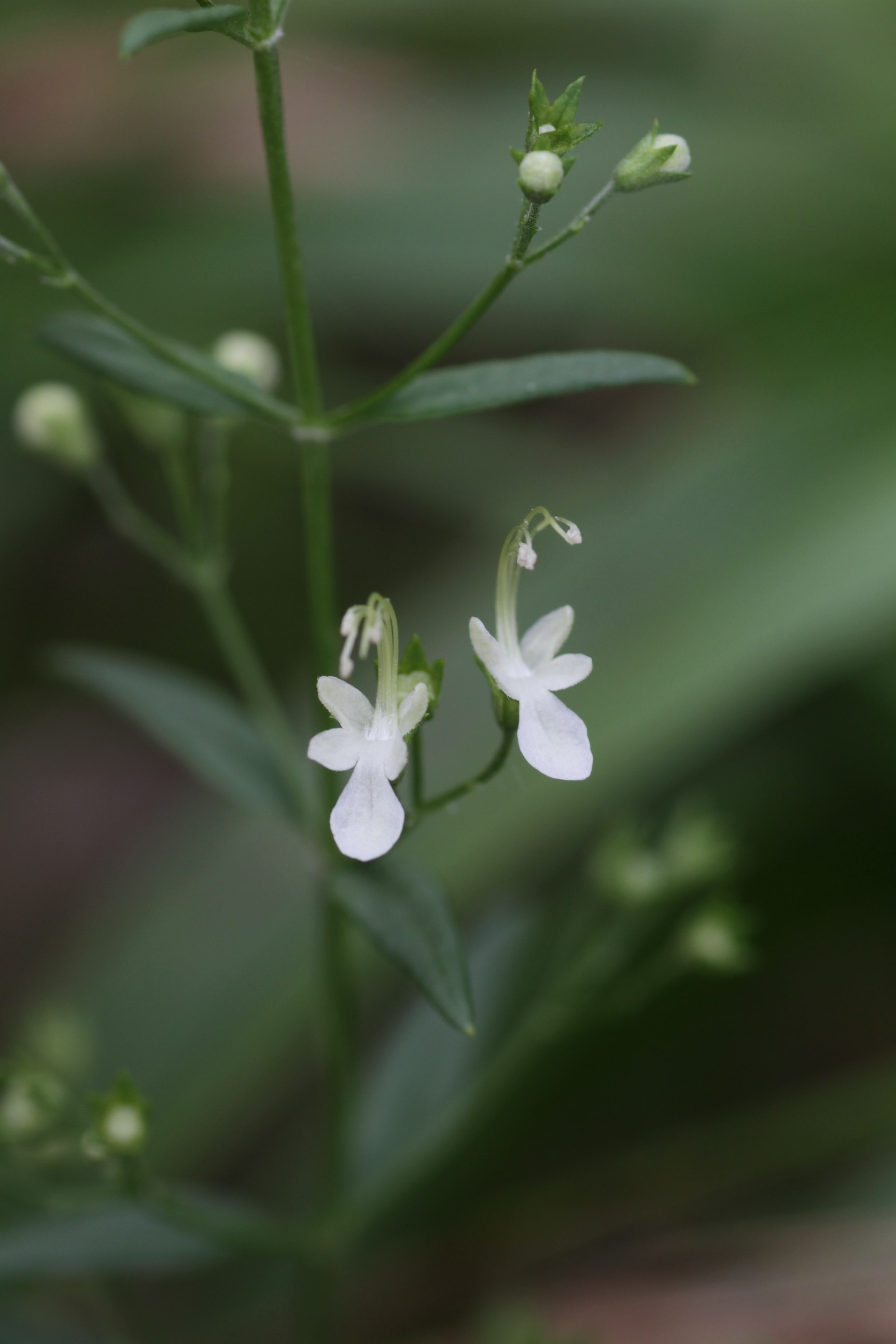

Conservation status
- Least Concern (SANBI Red List)

Scientific classification
- Kingdom: Plantae
- Clade: Embryophytes
- Clade: Tracheophytes
- Clade: Spermatophytes
- Clade: Angiosperms
- Clade: Eudicots
- Clade: Asterids
- Order: Lamiales
- Family: Lamiaceae
- Genus: Teucrium
- Species: T. kraussii

Binomial name
- Teucrium kraussii Codd

Synonyms
- Teucrium riparium Hochst.

= Teucrium kraussii =

Species of flowering plant

Teucrium kraussii, commonly called the river woodsage, is a species of flowering plant in the family Lamiaceae. It grows in open bush and grassland in Eswatini and South Africa′s Mpumalanga, KwaZulu-Natal, and Eastern Cape provinces.

== Description ==
This species is an erect, softly woody undershrub growing 0.5–1.1 m (1.6–3.6 ft) tall, branching from the base. The stems are four-angled, simple below and branched higher up, softly woody near the base and covered in fine to moderately dense hairs.

Leaves are almost stalkless, narrow and lance-shaped, 25–60 mm (0.98–2.36 in) long, with smooth to slightly toothed margins near the tip; the upper surface is nearly hairless, while the underside is more hairy and dotted with small glands.

The inflorescence forms a leafy, often loosely branched panicle in the upper part of the stem, with small flower clusters of two to seven flowers. The calyx is finely hairy and about 2.5–3.5 mm (0.098–0.138 in) long. The corolla is small, 5–6 mm (0.20–0.24 in) long, with a short tube and a slightly concave lower lip. The stamens project well beyond the corolla, extending 5–7 mm (0.20–0.28 in).

=== Identification ===
Teucrium kraussii overlaps with Teucrium trifidum in part of the Eastern Cape, where some specimens of the latter have leaf margins very like the former – almost completely lacking their usual deep lobes. They nevertheless remain smaller and greyer than the leaves of Teucrium kraussii.

== Etymology ==
Teucrium kraussii is named for German scientist and plant collector Christian Ferdinand Friedrich Krauss (1812–1890), who collected the species′ type specimen.

== See also ==
- List of Lamiaceae of South Africa
