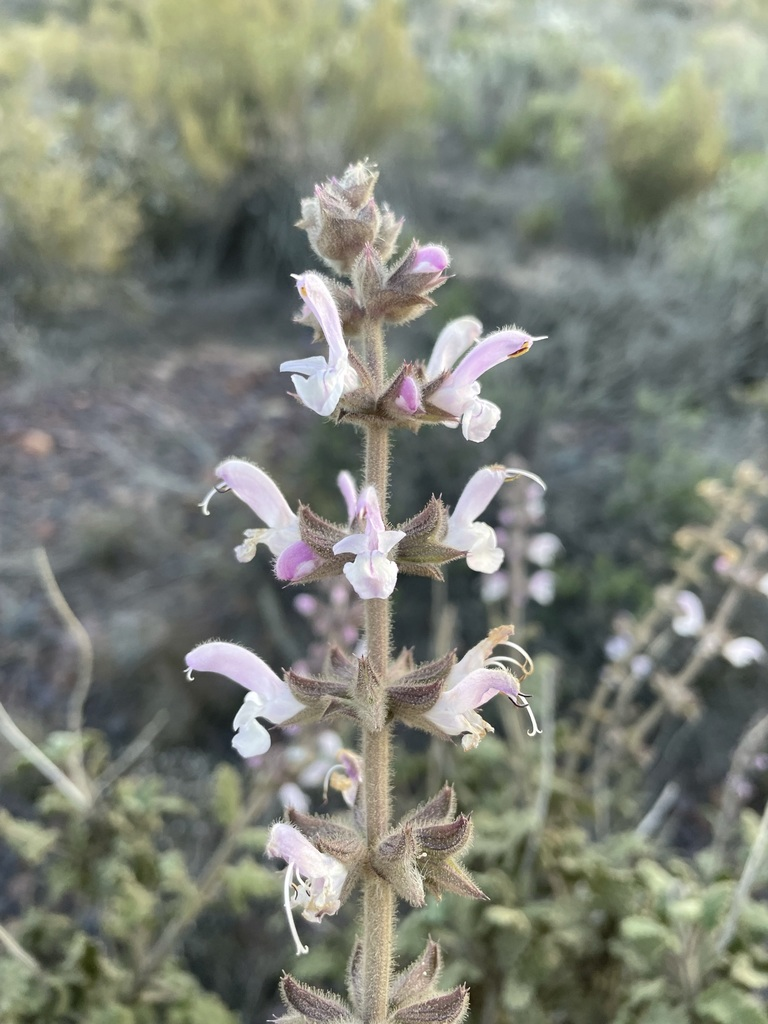

Conservation status
- Least Concern (SANBI Red List)

Scientific classification
- Kingdom: Plantae
- Clade: Tracheophytes
- Clade: Angiosperms
- Clade: Eudicots
- Clade: Asterids
- Order: Lamiales
- Family: Lamiaceae
- Genus: Salvia
- Species: S. disermas

Binomial name
- Salvia disermas L.

= Salvia disermas =

Species of shrub

Salvia disermas (dassie sage) is a herbaceous perennial shrub native to South Africa (the Cape Provinces, the Free State and the Northern Provinces), found in streambeds, moist forest, grassland, and disturbed ground. It was originally specified as rugosa, but was changed to disermas. It grows throughout west Africa, with its greatest concentration in South Africa, where it is used medicinally as a tea, and as a lotion for treating sores.

Salvia disermas is an evergreen that reaches about 2 ft (0.61 m) in height and width, with numerous stems growing from the rootstock, each with multiple inflorescences that curve upward. The icy white to pale mauve flowers are less than 1.5 in (3.8 cm) long and held in a small green calyx. The individual flowers are not showy, but the plant blooms profusely, and is rarely out of bloom. The long narrow leaves are pale apple-green with a fragrance similar to hay.

== See also ==
- List of Lamiaceae of South Africa
