= Stachys graciliflora =

Conservation status
- Least Concern (SANBI Red List)

Scientific classification
- Kingdom: Plantae
- Clade: Tracheophytes
- Clade: Angiosperms
- Clade: Eudicots
- Clade: Asterids
- Order: Lamiales
- Family: Lamiaceae
- Genus: Stachys
- Species: S. graciliflora

Binomial name
- Stachys graciliflora C.Presl

Synonyms
- Stachys cooperi Skan

Species of shrub

Stachys graciliflora is a species of hedgenettle found in South Africa and Eswatini.

== Description ==
This species is a perennial herb with spreading to trailing stems that may climb slightly and can grow to 40 cm (16 in)} or more in length. The stems are sparsely branched and lightly covered with short backward-pointing hairs.

The leaves are borne on stalks and are often thin in texture. They are ovate to broadly ovate, 20–65 mm (0.79–2.56 in) long, with a blunt to slightly pointed tip and a deeply heart-shaped base with a wide notch. The margins are coarsely scalloped. Leaf surfaces are mostly hairless or sparsely hairy, with soft hairs on the upper surface.

The flowers are arranged in one to four whorls, forming a loose spike below or a short cluster towards the top. Each whorl bears four to six flowers. The bracts are leaf-like at the base and become smaller higher up. The calyx is softly hairy. The corolla is white, sometimes with mauve spots on the lower lip, and has a gently curved tube with an upright upper lip and a horizontal lower lip.

== Distribution and habitat ==
Sources differ on the geographical range of Stachys graciliflora. The South African National Biodiversity Institute′s South African National Plant Checklist and Red List of South African Plants list the South African provinces of the Western Cape, Eastern Cape, KwaZulu-Natal, Mpumalanga, and Limpopo, as well as Eswatini. So too does Kew′s Plants of the World Online.

The standard reference works, which are admittedly older, meanwhile describe a smaller distribution, from Knysna in the Cape to southern KwaZulu-Natal. All agree that the plant is typically found in damp places in forest margins, grassland, fynbos, and coastal scrub.

== See also ==
- List of Lamiaceae of South Africa
