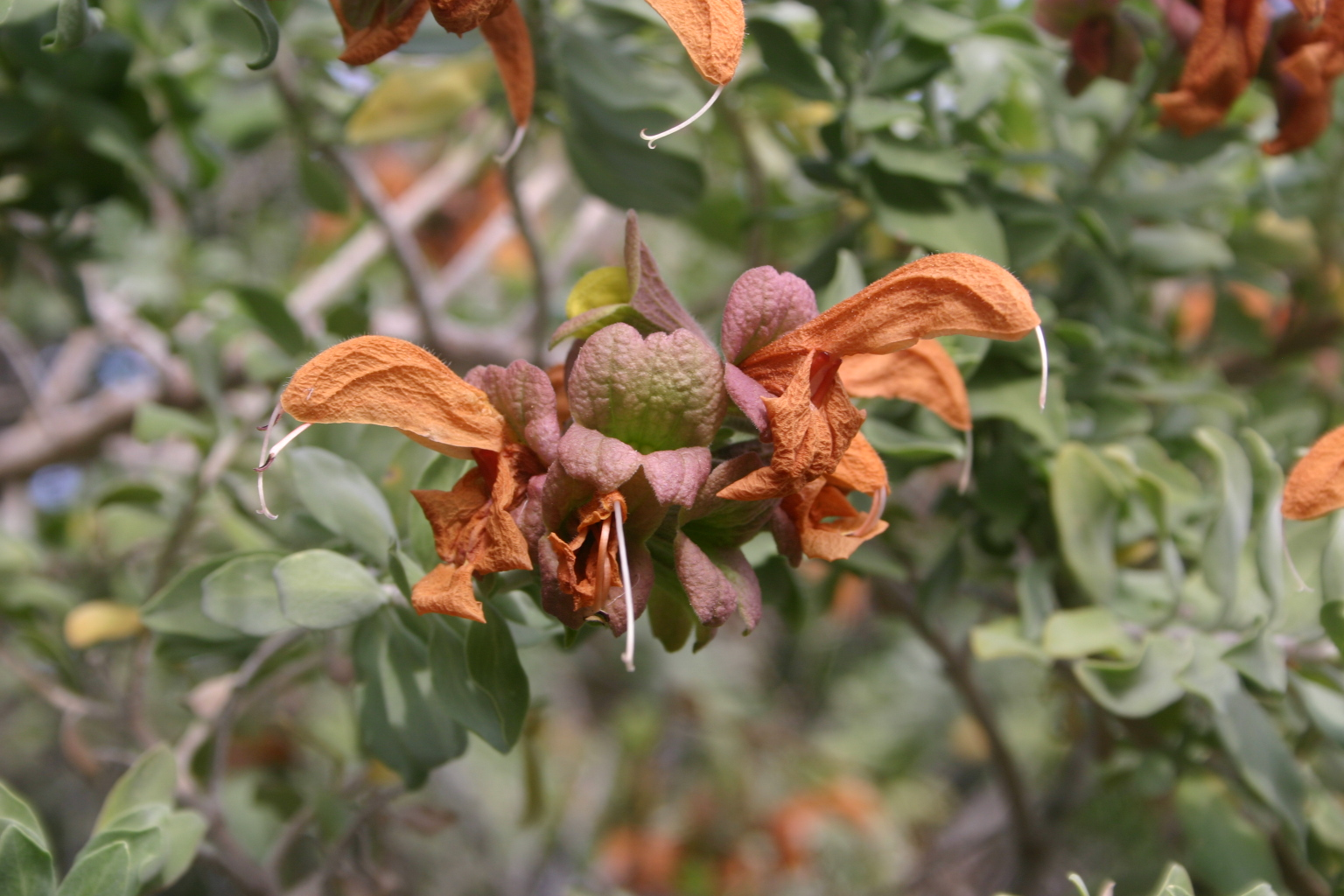

Conservation status
- Least Concern (SANBI Red List)

Scientific classification
- Kingdom: Plantae
- Clade: Tracheophytes
- Clade: Angiosperms
- Clade: Eudicots
- Clade: Asterids
- Order: Lamiales
- Family: Lamiaceae
- Genus: Salvia
- Species: S. aurea

Binomial name
- Salvia aurea L.

Synonyms
- Crolocos aurea (L.) Raf.; Salvia africana-lutea L., nom. inval.; Salvia colorata L.; Salvia eckloniana Benth.

= Salvia aurea =

Species of shrub

Salvia aurea (beach salvia, dune salvia, golden salvia, bruin- of sandsalie, geelblomsalie) is a shrubby evergreen perennial native to South Africa.

== Description ==
It has numerous woody stems growing to more than 1 m (3.3 ft)in height and width, with sparse grey-green leaves. The flowers start out as a bright yellow, turning into a rusty color, with the dark rusty-colored calyx persisting long after fruiting begins. The flowers are shaped like a parrot's beak and occur in pairs at the ends of branches.

== Taxonomy ==
The species was first named by Carl Linnaeus in 1753 using the specific epithet afr.lutea, which may be expanded to africana lutea (or africana-lutea). Epithets consisting of two adjectives are not allowed by the International Code of Nomenclature for algae, fungi, and plants, so this name is invalid. Linnaeus's 1762 name Salvia aurea was the accepted name as of April 2024. The lutea part of Linnaeus's 1753 name, meaning yellow, was based on the belief that there were no brown flowers.

== Distribution and habitat ==
This species is native to coastal sand dunes and hills on the coast of the Western Cape, Eastern Cape and Northern Cape in South Africa.

== Traditional use ==
Salvia aurea was used by early European settlers to treat colds, tuberculosis, and chronic bronchitis. Traditional indigenous healers use it for respiratory ailments, influenza, gynaecological complaints, fever, headaches and digestive disorders.

== See also ==
- List of Lamiaceae of South Africa
