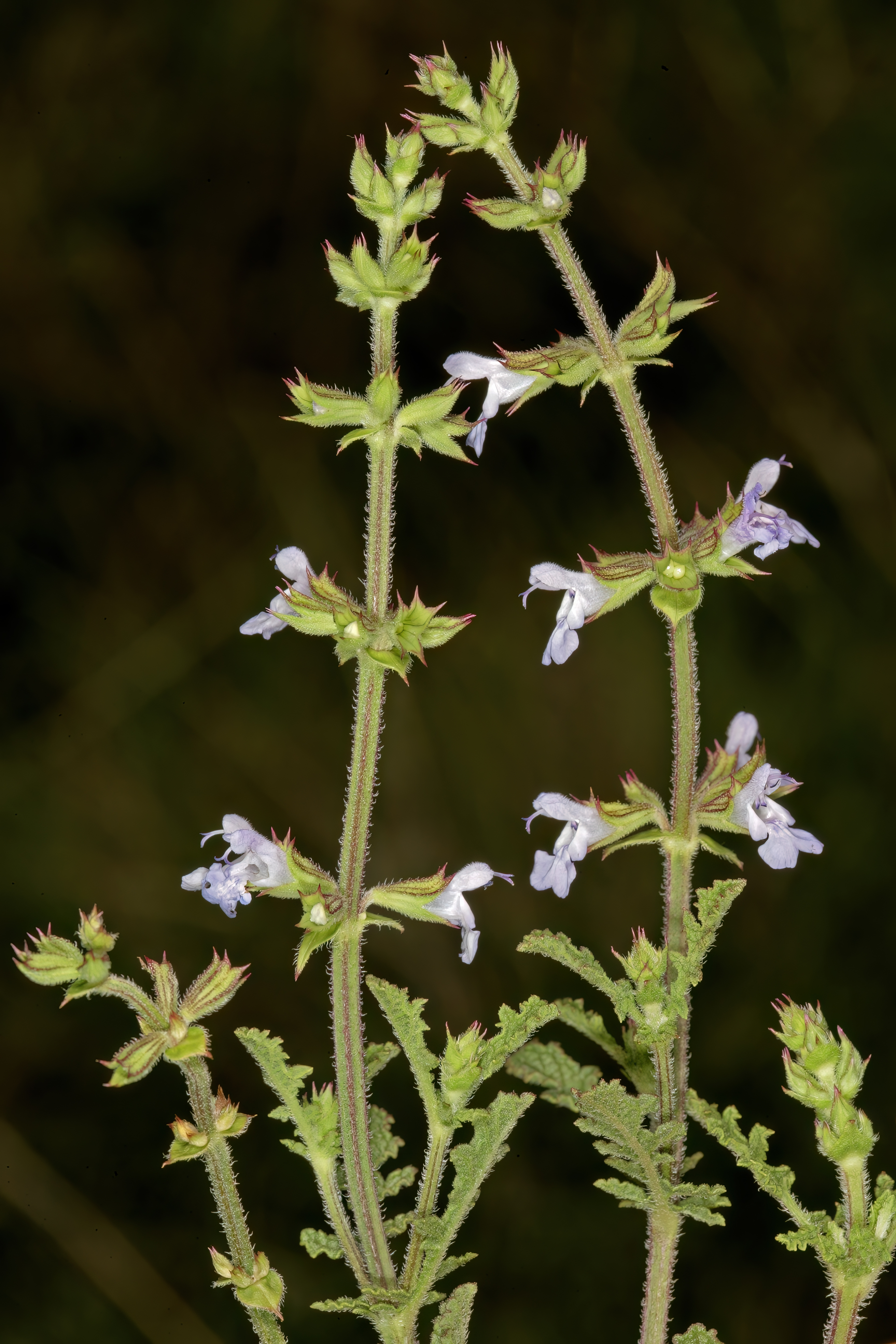
- Salvia runcinata near Wolmaransstad, North West Province, South Africa

Conservation status
- Least Concern (SANBI Red List)

Scientific classification
- Kingdom: Plantae
- Clade: Embryophytes
- Clade: Tracheophytes
- Clade: Spermatophytes
- Clade: Angiosperms
- Clade: Eudicots
- Clade: Asterids
- Order: Lamiales
- Family: Lamiaceae
- Genus: Salvia
- Species: S. runcinata

Binomial name
- Salvia runcinata L.f.

Synonyms
- Salvia monticola Benth.; Salvia runcinata var. grandiflora Skan; Salvia runcinata var. major Benth.; Salvia runcinata var. nana Skan; Salvia sisymbrifolia Skan

= Salvia runcinata =

Species of flowering plant

Salvia runcinata is a species of southern African sage commonly called the hard sage (″hardesalie″ in Afrikaans). It is present in all provinces of South Africa, as well as in Lesotho, south-eastern Botswana, and western Zimbabwe. Its habitats are usually grassy; tend towards having heavy, damp soils; and may be cultivated, overgrazed, or otherwise disturbed.

== Description ==
Salvia runcinata is a perennial, erect herb 15–50 cm (6–20 in) tall, with one to several stems arising from a taproot or occasionally from a creeping rootstock. Stems are hispid to crisply hairy and gland-dotted.

Leaves are shortly petiolate, the upper sometimes sessile; the blade is runcinate-pinnatipartite to lyrate, rarely almost entire, oblong-lanceolate to obovate in outline, 30–90 mm (1.2–3.5 in) or more long by 15–30 mm (0.6–1.2 in) or more wide, rough-hairy and gland-dotted, with rounded to triangular lobes.

The inflorescence consists of several to many verticillasters, widely spaced below and denser above, each bearing 4–8 flowers. The calyx is roughly hairy and gland-dotted, 5–8 mm (0.2–0.3 in) long.

The corolla is white or pale blue to mauve or purplish, 7–14 mm (0.28–0.55 in) long; the tube is 4.5–9 mm (0.18–0.35 in) long, the upper lip straight, and the lower lip usually slightly longer.

Salvia runcinata flowers from October to April.

=== Identification ===
Salvia runcinata is extremely variable in form, and its limits as a species are not well understood. Its closest ally is S. stenophylla, and it can be very difficult distinguishing some forms of it from that species or from S. repens. In his revision of Salvia in Africa, the botanist Ian Hedge argued that ″the range of variation suggests that hybridisation and introgression may be a factor in the confusion.″

On the whole, S. stenophylla tends to have narrower leaves with finer segments and stems that are close to glabrous. S. repens has a creeping rootstock, which S. runcinata rarely has, and it′s less likely to be found in arid areas.

== Etymology ==
The species name ″runcinata″ is derived from the Latin word for ″saw-toothed″, and refers to the plant′s leaf margins, which have teeth pointing backward toward the base.
