= Salvia triangularis =

Conservation status
- Least Concern (SANBI Red List)

Scientific classification
- Kingdom: Plantae
- Clade: Embryophytes
- Clade: Tracheophytes
- Clade: Spermatophytes
- Clade: Angiosperms
- Clade: Eudicots
- Clade: Asterids
- Order: Lamiales
- Family: Lamiaceae
- Genus: Salvia
- Species: S. triangularis

Binomial name
- Salvia triangularis Thunb.

Synonyms
- Salvia tenuifolia Burch. ex Benth.

Species of shrub

Salvia triangularis is a species of sage commonly called triangleleaf sage. It is endemic to South Africa′s Eastern Cape province, where it grows in grass at 20–1,950 m (66–6,398 ft) in altitude, from Qonce (King William′s Town) to Humansdorp and inland to KwaNojoli (Somerset East) and Keiskammahoek.

== Description ==
Salvia triangularis is a perennial herb, scarcely woody at the base, with slender ascending or scrambling stems up to 50 cm (20 in) tall or occasionally longer. Stems are four-angled, bearing long spreading non-glandular hairs below and mainly glandular hairs above.

Leaves are simple, ovate-triangular, about 3 cm × 2 cm (1.18 in × 0.79 in), with a cordate to truncate base and crenate margins; both surfaces are softly hairy, with oil glands present beneath. The petiole is up to or a little over 2 cm (0.79 in) long and hairy.

The inflorescence is simple or branched, with up to ten verticillasters, each six-flowered and widely spaced below. The calyx is tubular, 9–11 mm (0.35–0.43 in) long in flower, expanding to 12–16 mm (0.47–0.63 in) in fruit, and covered with glandular and non-glandular hairs.

The corolla is purple, mauve, or pale blue, about 15 mm (0.59 in) long, with a nearly straight upper lip and a slightly shorter lower lip.

The nutlets are broadly obovate-trigonous, dark brown, and about 2 mm × 1.5 mm (0.079 in × 0.059 in).

Salvia triangularis flowers from August to October.

== Identification ==
It most closely resembles S. aurita but has much smaller leaves and flowers to distinguish it. The smaller flowers also help to distinguish it from S. scabra, and its leaves are entire as opposed to lobed.
