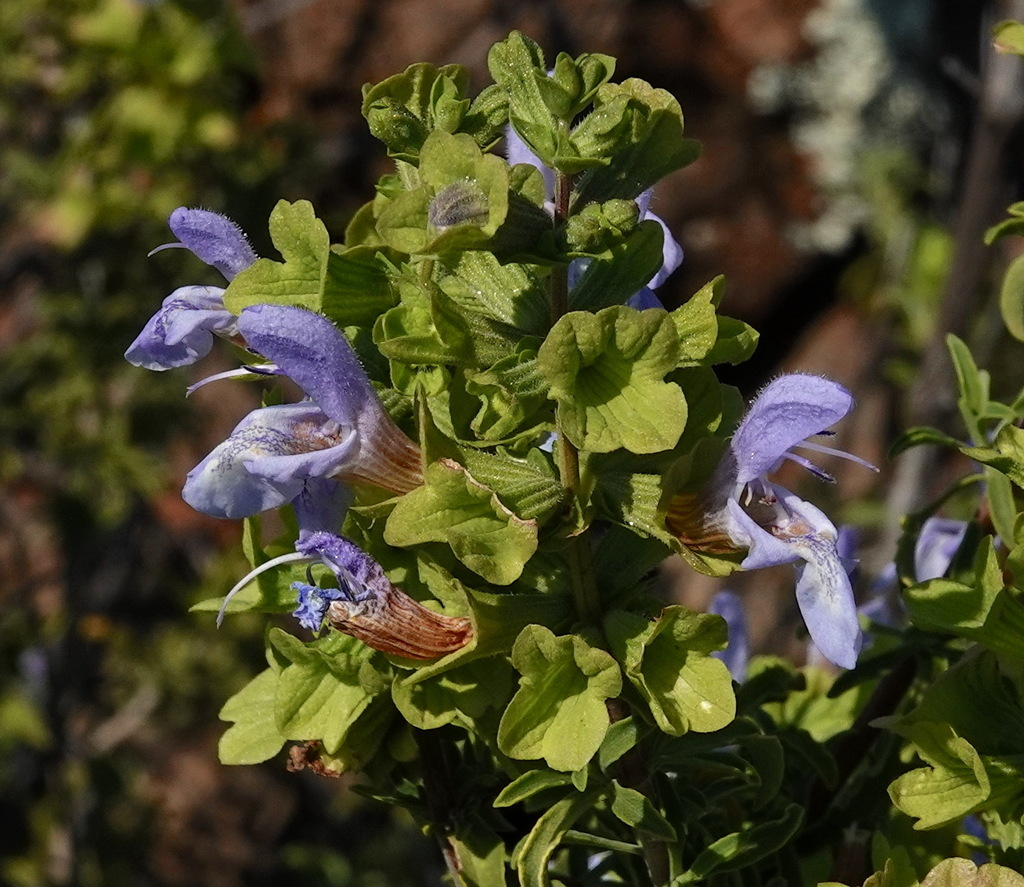

Conservation status
- Least Concern (SANBI Red List)

Scientific classification
- Kingdom: Plantae
- Clade: Tracheophytes
- Clade: Angiosperms
- Clade: Eudicots
- Clade: Asterids
- Order: Lamiales
- Family: Lamiaceae
- Genus: Salvia
- Species: S. dentata

Binomial name
- Salvia dentata Aiton

= Salvia dentata =

Species of shrub

Salvia dentata (Namaqua sage) is a perennial shrub with short twiggy branches native to western South Africa just north of Cape Town, growing between 2,000 to 5,000 ft (610 to 1,520 m) elevation on dry hillsides, slopes, and streambeds. It was first described by William Aiton in 1789.

It grows 6 ft (1.8 m) tall in its native habitat, less in cultivation, with unusual (for the Salvia family) round stems. The aromatic gray-green leathery leaves are small (.5 in (1.3 cm)) and tightly packed. The short 2 in (5.1 cm) inflorescence is tightly packed with whorls of 1 in (2.5 cm) flowers that range in color from pale blue to light lavender. As the calyces age they expand and turn pink, complementing the color of the flowers.

== See also ==
- List of Lamiaceae of South Africa
