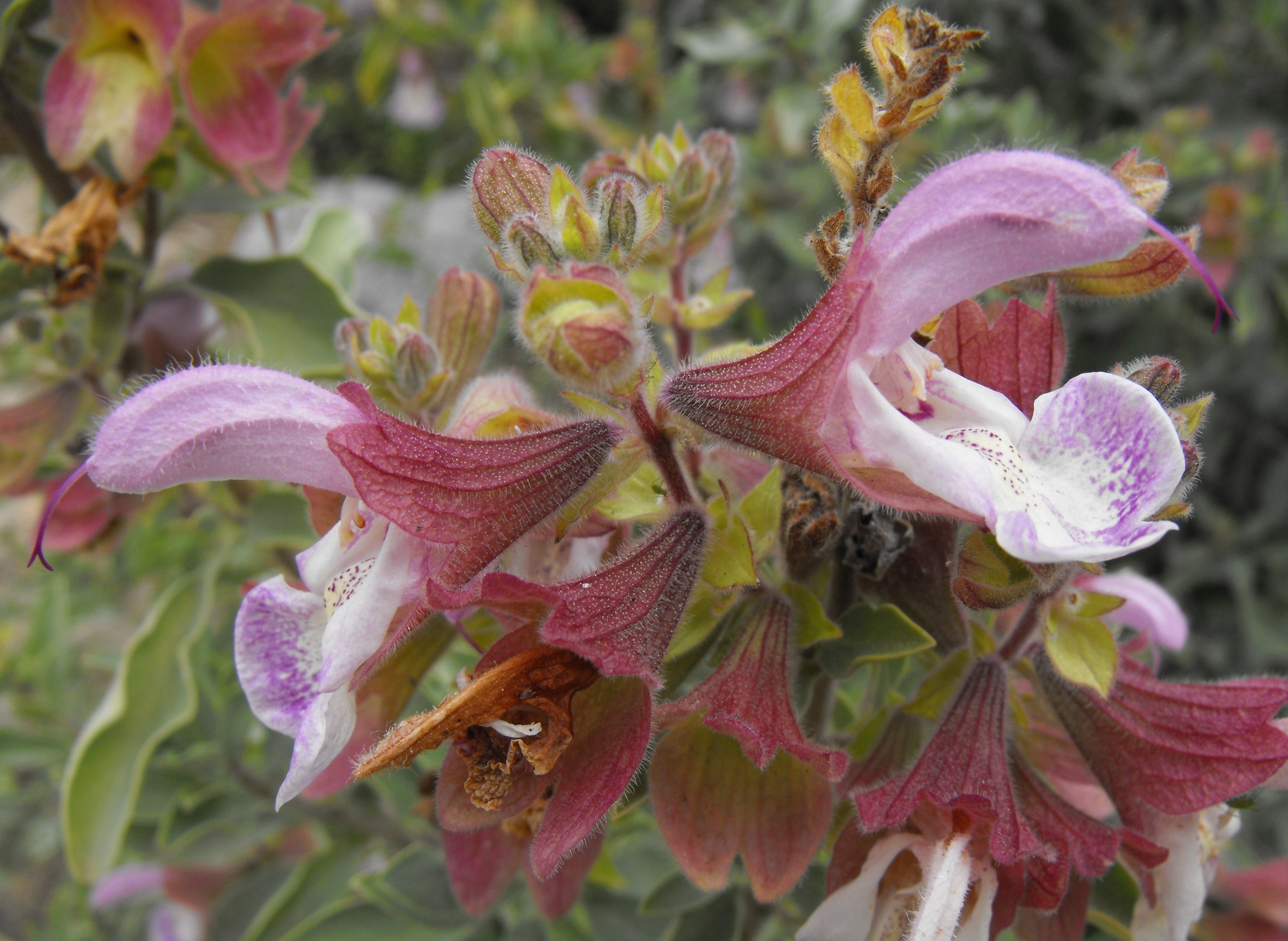

Conservation status
- Least Concern (SANBI Red List)

Scientific classification
- Kingdom: Plantae
- Clade: Tracheophytes
- Clade: Angiosperms
- Clade: Eudicots
- Clade: Asterids
- Order: Lamiales
- Family: Lamiaceae
- Genus: Salvia
- Species: S. dolomitica

Binomial name
- Salvia dolomitica Codd

= Salvia dolomitica =

Species of shrub

Salvia dolomitica (the dolomite sage or Pilgrim's Rest pink sage) is a perennial shrub native to the Mpumalanga and Limpopo provinces of South Africa, typically growing at 900–1500 m elevation. Profusely covered with grey leaves, it grows to 2 m in height and width in the wild, with pale lilac flowers.

== See also ==
- List of Lamiaceae of South Africa
