= Stachys afra =

Conservation status
- Least Concern (SANBI Red List)

Scientific classification
- Kingdom: Plantae
- Clade: Embryophytes
- Clade: Tracheophytes
- Clade: Spermatophytes
- Clade: Angiosperms
- Clade: Eudicots
- Clade: Asterids
- Order: Lamiales
- Family: Lamiaceae
- Genus: Stachys
- Species: S. afra

Binomial name
- Stachys afra E.Mey.ex Benth.

Synonyms
- Stachys caffra E.Mey.ex Benth.

Species of flowering plant

Stachys afra is a species of hedgenettle endemic to South Africa. The species epithet was caffra prior to August 2024, when a nomenclatural change voted for by the International Botanical Congress came into effect, impacting over 200 plant species.

== Description ==
This species is an erect, softly branched shrub growing 1–3 m (3.3–9.8 ft) tall. The stems are slender and covered with fine, star-shaped hairs, becoming smoother with age.

The leaves are borne on short stalks and are thin-textured and lanceolate, 30–90 mm (1.2–3.5 in) long. The upper surface is sparsely hairy, while the underside is paler and densely hairy. Leaves taper to the base, end in a pointed tip, and have very finely toothed margins except near the base.

The flowers are borne at the ends of branches in several spaced whorls, becoming more crowded towards the tip. Each whorl carries 4–10 flowers, with leaf-like bracts that decrease in size upwards.

The calyx is softly hairy. The corolla is white, cream, or greenish yellow, with a short, slightly curved tube and a two-lipped form, the lower lip longer than the upper.

S. sublobata flowers from September to March.

== Distribution and habitat ==
S. afra grows in forest margins and alongside shaded streams in Limpopo, Mpumalanga, KwaZulu-Natal′s Midlands and Drakensberg foothills at elevations of 1,300–2,000 m (4,300–6,600 ft), and further south to semi-coastal parts of the Eastern Cape province, as far as Peddie.

== See also ==
- List of Lamiaceae of South Africa
