= Stachys tubulosa =

Conservation status
- Least Concern (SANBI Red List)

Scientific classification
- Kingdom: Plantae
- Clade: Tracheophytes
- Clade: Angiosperms
- Clade: Eudicots
- Clade: Asterids
- Order: Lamiales
- Family: Lamiaceae
- Genus: Stachys
- Species: S. tubulosa

Binomial name
- Stachys tubulosa MacOwan

Synonyms
- Stachys dolichodeira Briq.

Species of flowering plant

Stachys tubulosa, commonly called the mauve woundwort, is a species of hedgenettle found in South Africa and Eswatini.

== Description ==
Stachys tubulosa is a softly hairy, straggling herb with weak, slender stems that are sparsely branched and have long internodes.

The leaves are borne on long stalks and have thin, broadly ovate blades, 35–65 mm (1.4–2.6 in) long, with a deeply heart-shaped base, an acute tip, and evenly scalloped margins. The leaf surface is softly hairy, especially along the veins.

The flowers are arranged in one to three short, rounded, or interrupted whorls, each bearing four to six almost stalkless flowers. The calyx is softly hairy. The corolla is pinkish white flecked with mauve or deep mauve, with a long, slightly curved tube and two lips, the upper lip longer and held upright, and the lower lip shorter and curved downward.

S. tubulosa flowers from November to April.

== Distribution and habitat ==
It is found in damp, shady forest and at forest margins in Eswatini and KwaZulu-Natal′s coast and sub-escarpment grasslands. Some older sources include the Eastern Cape in the geographic range, but this is because Umzimkhulu, now in KwaZulu-Natal, was once an exclave of that province.

== See also ==
- List of Lamiaceae of South Africa
