= Stachys flexuosa =

Conservation status
- Least Concern (SANBI Red List)

Scientific classification
- Kingdom: Plantae
- Clade: Embryophytes
- Clade: Tracheophytes
- Clade: Spermatophytes
- Clade: Angiosperms
- Clade: Eudicots
- Clade: Asterids
- Order: Lamiales
- Family: Lamiaceae
- Genus: Stachys
- Species: S. flexuosa

Binomial name
- Stachys flexuosa Skan

Species of shrub

Stachys flexuosa, the Amathole woundwort, is a species of hedgenettle endemic to South Africa.

== Description ==
This species is a small perennial herb, 15–25 cm (5.9–9.8 in) tall, branching at the base. The stems are slender, spreading to upright, and sparsely branched. They are fairly densely covered with long, spreading hairs, with some shorter glandular hairs mixed in.

The leaves are borne on short stalks and are ovate, 10–20 mm (0.39–0.79 in) long. They have a blunt to rounded tip, a squared to slightly heart-shaped base, and scalloped margins. The upper surface is softly hairy, while the underside is rougher, with hairs mainly along the veins.

The flowers are purple and arranged in a fairly dense spike of a few small whorls, each bearing two to six flowers. The flower stalk is hairy and slightly glandular. The calyx is also hairy with some glands present. The corolla has a short tube with an upright upper lip and a downward-curving lower lip.

Stachys flexuosa flowers from November to April.

== Distribution and habitat ==
Stachys flexuosa is present in a curious mix of habitats. In KwaZulu-Natal, it grows in mountain grassland at elevations of 1,400–2,300 m (4,600–7,500 ft). In the Eastern Cape, it is found in higher elevations between Katberg and Hogsback, but also in the coastal belt south of Port St Johns.

== See also ==
- List of Lamiaceae of South Africa
