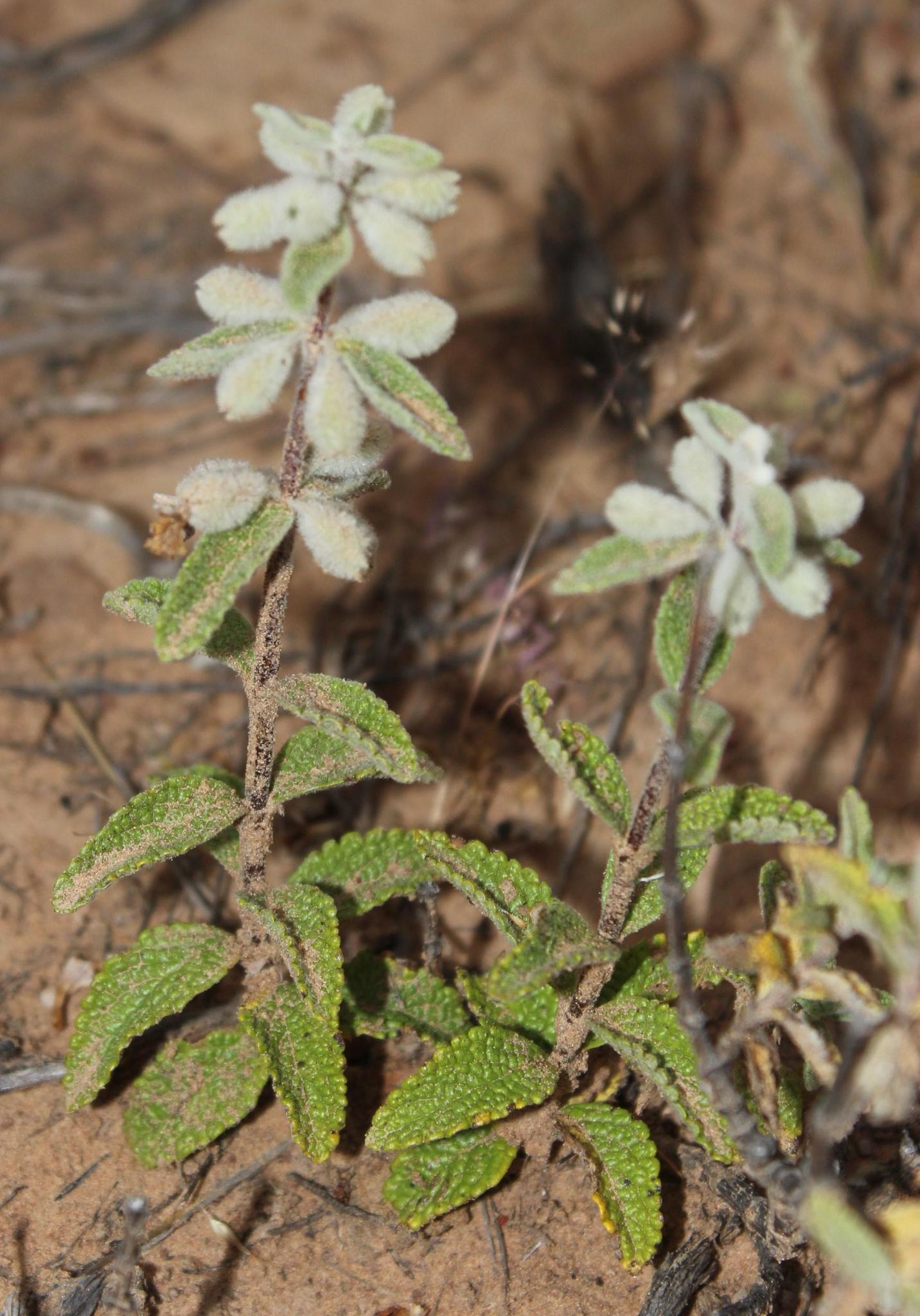

Conservation status
- Least Concern (SANBI Red List)

Scientific classification
- Kingdom: Plantae
- Clade: Embryophytes
- Clade: Tracheophytes
- Clade: Spermatophytes
- Clade: Angiosperms
- Clade: Eudicots
- Clade: Asterids
- Order: Lamiales
- Family: Lamiaceae
- Genus: Stachys
- Species: S. lamarckii

Binomial name
- Stachys lamarckii Benth.

Synonyms
- Stachys nutans Benth.; Stachys rugosa Lam.; Sideritis decumbens Thunb.

= Stachys lamarckii =

Species of flowering plant

Stachys lamarckii, the coddled woundwort, is a species of hedgenettle found in South Africa and Namibia.

== Description ==
This species is a shrub 0.2–1 m (7.9 in – 3 ft 3.4 in) tall, with ascending branches that are densely white and woolly on younger growth, becoming glabrous and brownish-purple with age.

The leaves are subsessile or borne on short stalks, with fairly thick, rugose blades that are elliptic to ovate-elliptic, 20–50 mm (0.79–1.97 in) long. The upper surface is sparsely to fairly densely stellate-tomentose, while the lower surface is more densely woolly. The leaf margins are crenate, with rounded to blunt tips and obtuse to wedge-shaped bases.

The flowers are arranged in few to several dense whorls, each bearing six or more flowers, becoming more crowded towards the apex of the inflorescence. The calyx is very densely white to cream-coloured and woolly, 8–11 mm (0.31–0.43 in) long. The corolla is yellow, with a short tube, an ascending upper lip, and a spreading lower lip.

Stachys lamarckii flowers from August to October.

== Distribution and habitat ==
Stachys lamarckii is found among rocks in the mountains of the south-western Great Karoo through the Namaqualand to the Richtersveld at altitudes of 600–1,500 m (2,000–4,900 ft). There are records from far-southern Namibia too.

== Etymology ==
The species epithet honours the French naturalist Jean-Baptiste de Lamarck (1744–1829).

== See also ==
- List of Lamiaceae of South Africa
