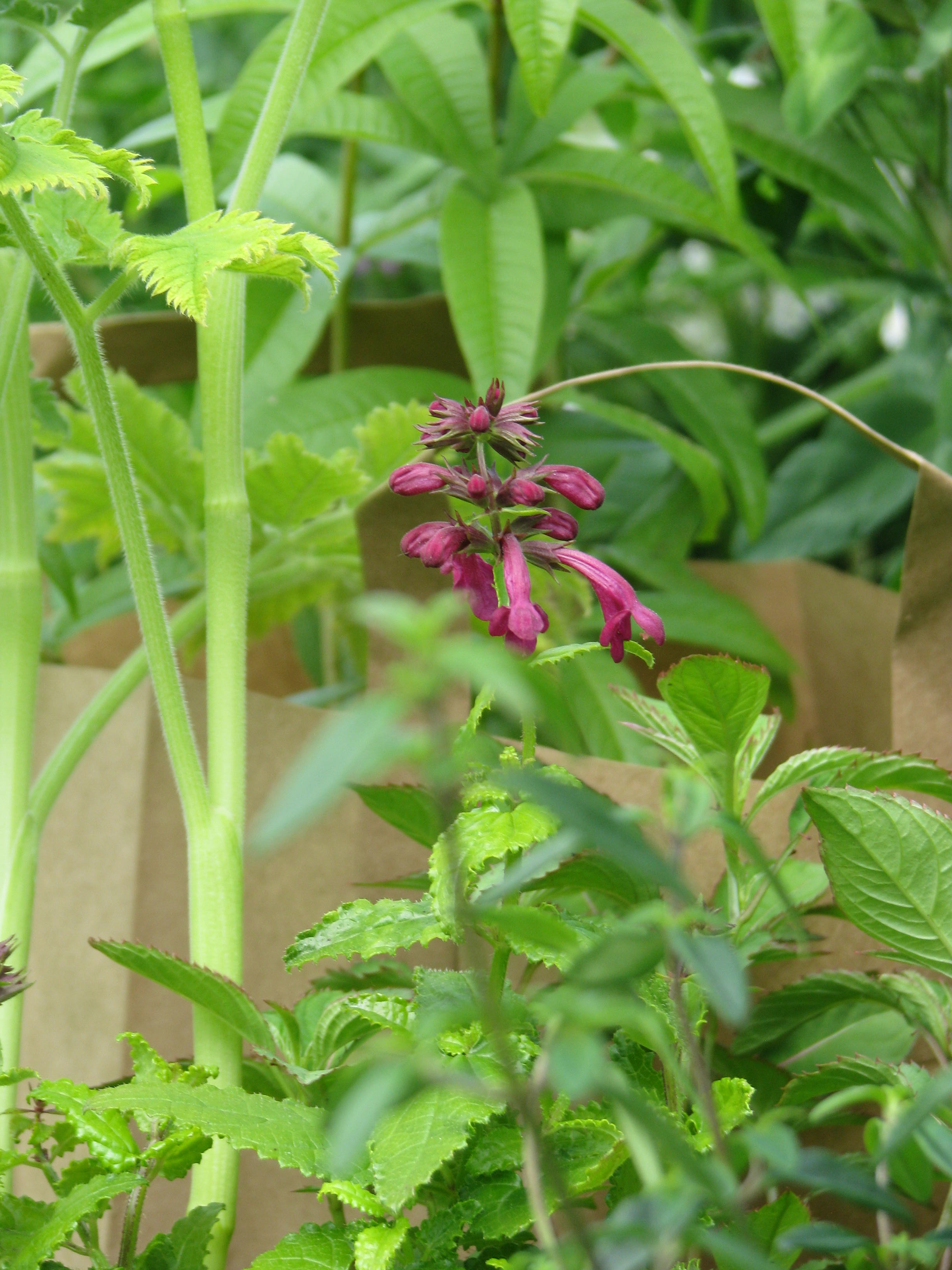

Conservation status
- Least Concern (SANBI Red List)

Scientific classification
- Kingdom: Plantae
- Clade: Embryophytes
- Clade: Tracheophytes
- Clade: Spermatophytes
- Clade: Angiosperms
- Clade: Eudicots
- Clade: Asterids
- Order: Lamiales
- Family: Lamiaceae
- Genus: Stachys
- Species: S. thunbergii

Binomial name
- Stachys thunbergii Benth.

Synonyms
- Galeopsis hispida Thunb.; Stachys hispida (Thunb.) Briq.

= Stachys thunbergii =

Species of flowering plant

Stachys thunbergii, commonly called the smooth or porphyrous woundwort, is a distinctive species of hedgenettle endemic to South Africa.

== Description ==
It is a perennial herb with stout, four-angled stems that are erect or ascending and can grow up to 2 m (6.6 ft) long. The stems are sparsely branched, slightly woody, and armed with strong backward-pointing prickles along the angles and at the nodes; they are otherwise smooth.

The leaves are borne on short stalks and have thick, somewhat wrinkled blades that dry dark brown. They are ovate to lanceolate, 30–60 mm (1.2–2.4 in) long, with a heart-shaped base, an acute tip, and finely scalloped margins. Leaf surfaces are sparsely hairy to nearly hairless.

The flowers are arranged in loose to fairly dense spikes 60–150 mm (2.4–5.9 in) long, with 4–6 flowers per whorl. The calyx is slightly hairy and spine-tipped. The corolla is red, magenta, or purple, with a gently curved tube and two lips, the lower lip slightly longer than the upper.

S. thunbergii flowers from September to March.

== Distribution and habitat ==
The larger population of S. thunbergii is in the Eastern Cape province, where it grows in forest margins and closed woodland at altitudes of 120–950 m (390–3,120 ft) from George to Humansdorp. In the Western Cape province, it is most often encountered on the south-eastern slopes of Devil′s Peak and adjoining mountains in the Table Mountain National Park. There are also some scattered records of the species between these two centres.

== Etymology ==
S. thunbergii is named for Carl Peter Thunberg, a Dutch botanist of the late 18th century who first described it as Galeopsis hispida.

== See also ==
- List of Lamiaceae of South Africa
