= Salvia obtusata =

Conservation status
- Vulnerable (SANBI Red List)

Scientific classification
- Kingdom: Plantae
- Clade: Embryophytes
- Clade: Tracheophytes
- Clade: Spermatophytes
- Clade: Angiosperms
- Clade: Eudicots
- Clade: Asterids
- Order: Lamiales
- Family: Lamiaceae
- Genus: Salvia
- Species: S. obtusata

Binomial name
- Salvia obtusata Thunb.

Synonyms
- Salvia marginata E.Mey.

Species of flowering plant

Salvia obtusata is a species of sage commonly called Coega sage. It is endemic to South Africa′s Eastern Cape province, where it is found growing in well-drained, gravelly soils from Kariega to Albany.

The Red List of South African Plants lists S. obtusata as Vulnerable, citing ″severe, rapid and ongoing″ habitat loss from development around Coega and east of Gqeberha.

== Description ==
Salvia obtusata is a perennial herb, somewhat woody at the base, with ascending stems reaching about 50 cm (20 in) or more in length. Stems are glabrous below and glabrous to sparsely hairy above.

Leaves are petiolate, the blade broadly elliptic to ovate in outline, 25 mm–50 mm × 15 mm–30 mm (1.0 in–2.0 in × 0.6 in–1.2 in), often drying dark brown. They are subentire or lyrate-pinnatifid, with a large terminal lobe and one or two pairs of smaller basal lobes; the upper surface is almost hairless, while the lower surface is sparsely hairy along the veins and margins. The margin is coarsely crenate, and the petiole is up to 30 mm (1.2 in) long, glabrous or bearing a few long, stiff hairs.

The inflorescence consists of up to ten verticils, spaced apart below and closer together towards the apex, each bearing two to eight flowers. The calyx is tubular-campanulate, sparsely hispid and often tinged purple, reaching up to 1 cm (0.39 in) in fruit; the upper lip bears three subequal, acuminate teeth 1–1.5 mm (0.04–0.06 in) long.

The lilac-tinted corolla is 20–25 mm (0.8–1.0 in) long, with a tube about 18 mm (0.7 in) long, a straight upper lip about 3 mm (0.12 in) long, and a lower lip about 5 mm (0.2 in) long.

Flowering is from September to April, being more prolific in South Africa′s spring and early summer.

=== Identification ===
Salvia obtusata is most closely related to S. scabra, and its geographic range falls wholly within that of the latter. S. scabra has a longer corolla to distinguish it, and its stems and upper leaf surfaces are less smooth than in S. obtusata. Another sometimes similar-looking species present in the area, S. repens, is also less glabrous on stems and leaves and has rhizomes.

== Etymology ==
The species epithet is derived from the Latin word obtusus and means blunt or blunted, likely referring to the rounded tips of the plant′s leaves.
