= Salvia albicaulis =

Conservation status
- Least Concern (SANBI Red List)

Scientific classification
- Kingdom: Plantae
- Clade: Embryophytes
- Clade: Tracheophytes
- Clade: Angiosperms
- Clade: Eudicots
- Clade: Asterids
- Order: Lamiales
- Family: Lamiaceae
- Genus: Salvia
- Species: S. albicaulis

Binomial name
- Salvia albicaulis Benth.

Synonyms
- Salvia dregeana Benth.

Species of shrub

Salvia albicaulis is a species of sage commonly called whitestem sage or Cederberg sage. It is endemic to South Africa's, Western Cape province, where it grows in well-drained soils on rocky slopes at altitudes of 200–1100 m, from Clanwilliam to Tulbagh.

== Description ==
It is a much-branched perennial shrub, typically reaching up to 50 cm in height, although it may grow taller. The species epithet albicaulis means ″white-stemmed″ in Latin, and this is arguably the plant's most distinguishing feature: its acutely quadrangular stems are white with a dense indumentum of very fine, short hairs.

The leaves are simple, thick, and leathery in texture. Their shape is variable, ranging from obovate to almost circular or spatula-shaped, with irregularly scalloped to toothed margins. They measure up to 3.5 cm long and 2.8 cm wide. Their upper surface is hairless or sparsely bristly, while the lower surface is white and densely hairy, with a prominent network of veins. The leaf stalk (petiole) is up to 1 cm long.

The inflorescence is highly branched, with up to eight closely spaced whorls, each bearing two (occasionally three) flowers. The floral leaves are lance-shaped and fall off early. Bracts are present. Flower stalks (pedicels) are up to 3 mm long.

The calyx is broadly bell-shaped, up to 12 mm long, with twelve veins, and is densely covered in long, white hairs. It expands little as the fruit develops. The upper lip has three teeth, with the central tooth shorter than the lateral ones; the lower lip bears two narrow, lance-shaped, sharply pointed teeth about 4 mm long.

The corolla is purplish, which further helps to distinguish the plant from related species like Salvia chamelaeagnea. It is up to 24 mm long, with a tube of about 10–12 mm. The upper hood of the corolla is curved. The staminal connective is about 12 mm long, with filaments approximately 5 mm long. The lower pollen sacs are free, sterile, and irregularly shaped.

The fruit consists of rounded, three-angled nutlets, brown in colour, measuring approximately 3 × 2 mm.

Salvia albicaulis flowers from November to May.

== See also ==
- List of Lamiaceae of South Africa
