= Stachys sublobata =

Conservation status
- Least Concern (SANBI Red List)

Scientific classification
- Kingdom: Plantae
- Clade: Embryophytes
- Clade: Tracheophytes
- Clade: Angiosperms
- Clade: Eudicots
- Clade: Asterids
- Order: Lamiales
- Family: Lamiaceae
- Genus: Stachys
- Species: S. sublobata

Binomial name
- Stachys sublobata Skan

Species of plant

Stachys sublobata is a species of hedgenettle endemic to South Africa's Western Cape province.

== Description ==
It is a low-growing, perennial herb with several stems that lie along the ground or rise slightly, reaching up to 0.3 m (1 ft 0 in) in length. The stems are sparsely hairy, with occasional longer spreading hairs.

The leaves help distinguish this species from others in the south-west Cape. They are small and borne on short stalks. The blades are fairly thick, narrowly triangular, and often folded along the midrib, measuring 10–15 mm (0.39–0.59 in) long. They have a heart-shaped base, an acute tip, and deeply scalloped margins with four or five rounded, lobe-like teeth on each side. Leaf surfaces are sparsely hairy, sometimes with small gland dots beneath.

The flowers are arranged in a loose inflorescence of a few whorls, each bearing two (occasionally up to six) flowers. The calyx is thinly hairy and glandular. The corolla is mauve, with a short tube and two lips, the lower lip longer and curved downward.

Stachys sublobata flowers from September to March.

== Distribution and habitat ==
Strachys sublobata is found in fynbos on sandstone slopes at elevations of 300–900 m (980–2,950 ft) from Robertson and Caledon to Mossel Bay, inland to Ladismith and Oudtshoorn.

== See also ==
- List of Lamiaceae of South Africa
