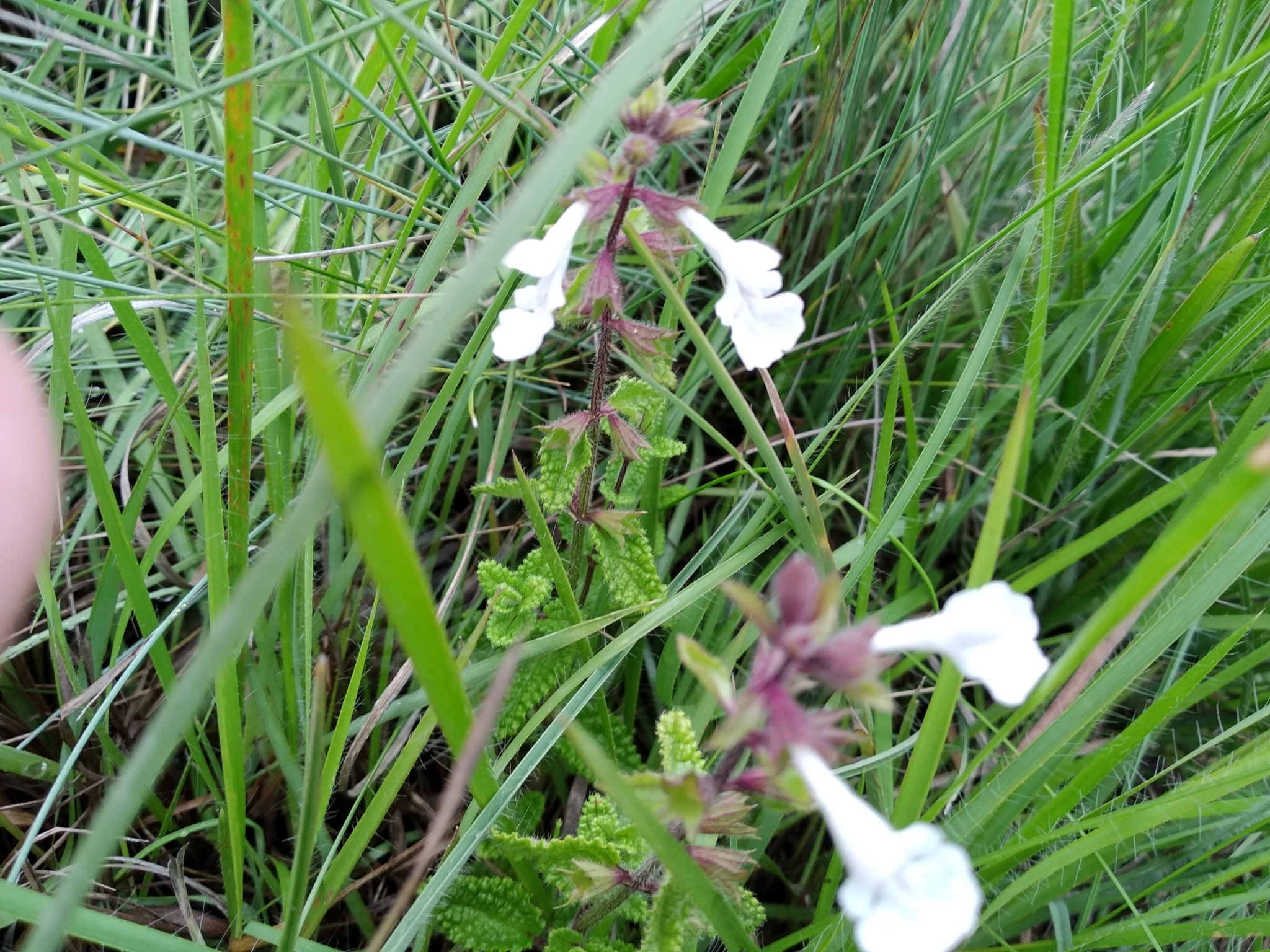

Conservation status
- Least Concern (SANBI Red List)

Scientific classification
- Kingdom: Plantae
- Clade: Embryophytes
- Clade: Tracheophytes
- Clade: Spermatophytes
- Clade: Angiosperms
- Clade: Eudicots
- Clade: Asterids
- Order: Lamiales
- Family: Lamiaceae
- Genus: Stachys
- Species: S. cymbalaria

Binomial name
- Stachys cymbalaria Briq.

Synonyms
- Stachys aethiopica L. var. tenella Kuntze; Stachys cymbalaria var. alba Skan

= Stachys cymbalaria =

Species of shrub

Stachys cymbalaria, the littleleaf woundwort, is a species of hedgenettle endemic to South Africa.

== Description ==
This species is a low-growing, perennial herb with prostrate stems that spread from a central taproot and reach up to 30 cm (12 in) in length. The stems are nearly hairless or bear a few long, fine spreading hairs, sometimes mixed with short glandular hairs.

The leaves are almost stalkless or borne on short stalks. They are broadly ovate to nearly round, 8–15 mm (0.31–0.59 in) long, with a rounded to blunt tip, a broadly heart-shaped base, and scalloped margins. Leaf surfaces are nearly smooth to lightly hairy or glandular.

The flowers are arranged in a loose inflorescence of one to five small whorls, each bearing two flowers. The bracts are elliptical and shorter than the calyx. The flowers are purple, pink, or white. The calyx is slightly hairy. The corolla has a short tube, with the upper lip held horizontally and the lower lip curved downward.

Stachys cymbalaria flowers from October to March.

== Distribution and habitat ==
Stachys cymbalaria can be found among rocks in mountain grassland at 900–2,200 m (3,000–7,200 ft) in elevation from southern KwaZulu-Natal to as far west as Graaff-Reinet in the Eastern Cape.

== See also ==
- List of Lamiaceae of South Africa
