= Stachys rudatisii =

Conservation status
- Least Concern (SANBI Red List)

Scientific classification
- Kingdom: Plantae
- Clade: Tracheophytes
- Clade: Angiosperms
- Clade: Eudicots
- Clade: Asterids
- Order: Lamiales
- Family: Lamiaceae
- Genus: Stachys
- Species: S. rudatisii

Binomial name
- Stachys rudatisii Skan

Species of shrub

Stachys rudatisii is a species of hedgenettle endemic to South Africa's KwaZulu-Natal province.

== Description ==
This species is a perennial herb with spreading or trailing stems that branch freely and grow to about 30 cm (12 in) or more in length. The stems are fairly stout, deeply grooved, and covered with both backward-pointing hairs and numerous short glandular hairs.

The leaves are borne on long stalks and have ovate blades, 30–45 mm (1.2–1.8 in) long, that are densely hairy and glandular. They have a rounded to blunt tip, a heart-shaped base, and shallowly scalloped margins.

The flowers are arranged in the leaf axils in small whorls of two, with leaf-like bracts that become smaller towards the tip of the stem. The calyx is hairy and glandular. The corolla is white, with a short tube and two lips, the lower lip broader and held horizontally.

=== Identification ===
Stachys rudatisii belongs to the so-called Stachys aethiopica Complex, which can make identification a challenge. Its typically two-flowered verticils help distinguish it from Stachys aethiopica, as do its larger and more finely crenate leaf margins, which stand in contrast to the latter′s smaller, more coarsely toothed leaves.

Stachys rudatisii differs from Stachys natalensis in having stems and leaves that are densely covered with stiff hairs and small glands.

== Distribution and habitat ==
Stachys rudatisii is found in the south of the KwaZulu-Natal among rocks in damp grassy places and in shady thickets.

== Etymology ==
The species epithet honours Hans Rudatis (1875–1934), a German-born plant, bird, and insect collector active in South Africa from 1904 following a stint in the Cameroon. He collected extensively in southern Natal while based on his small farm near Umgai, south of the Dumisa railway station, and he collected the type specimen of Stachys rudatisii in the vicinity.

== See also ==
- List of Lamiaceae of South Africa
