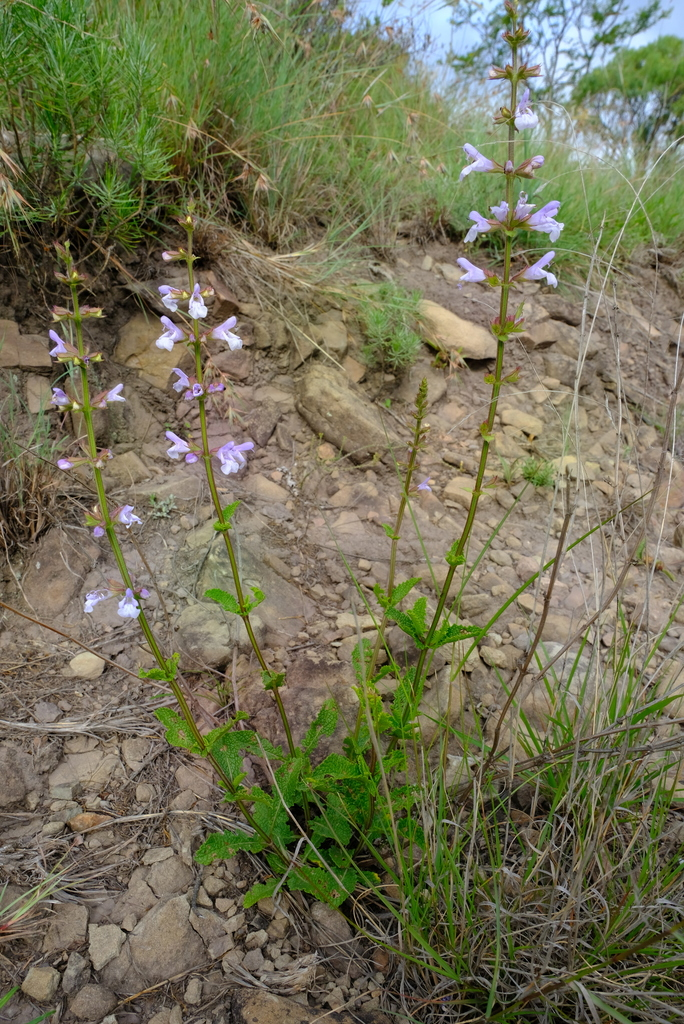

Scientific classification
- Kingdom: Plantae
- Clade: Tracheophytes
- Clade: Angiosperms
- Clade: Eudicots
- Clade: Asterids
- Order: Lamiales
- Family: Lamiaceae
- Genus: Salvia
- Species: S. aurita

Binomial name
- Salvia aurita L.f.

= Salvia aurita =

Species of shrub

Salvia aurita (African valley sage) is a herbaceous perennial shrub native to South Africa (the Cape Provinces, KwaZulu-Natal and the Northern Provinces) and Eswatini. It is found growing on streambanks. It grows to 1.2 m (3.9 ft) tall, with numerous blue, white, and lilac flowers growing in whorls on short racemes.

== See also ==
- List of Lamiaceae of South Africa
