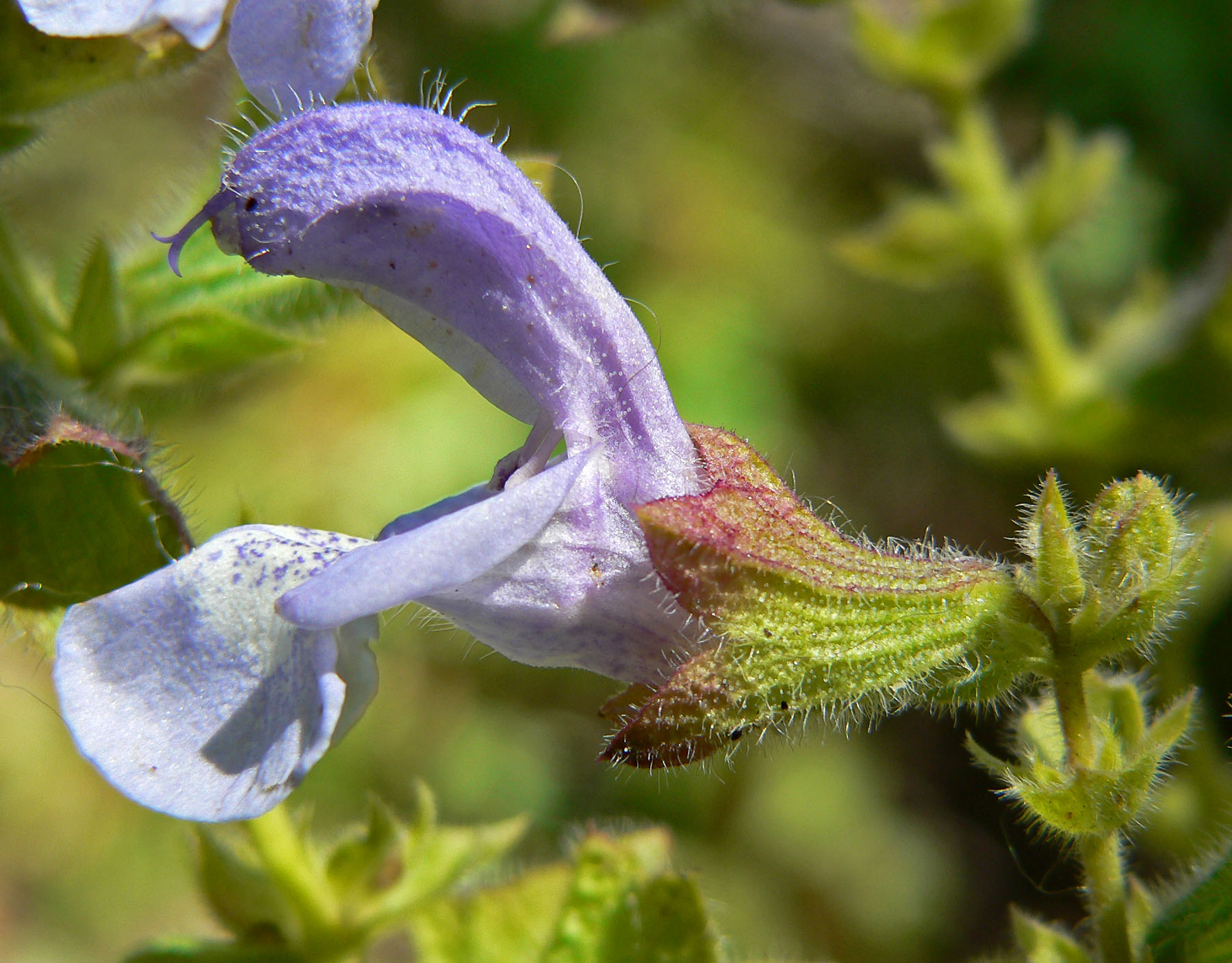

Conservation status
- Least Concern (SANBI Red List)

Scientific classification
- Kingdom: Plantae
- Clade: Tracheophytes
- Clade: Angiosperms
- Clade: Eudicots
- Clade: Asterids
- Order: Lamiales
- Family: Lamiaceae
- Genus: Salvia
- Species: S. africana

Binomial name
- Salvia africana L.

= Salvia africana =

Species of shrub

Salvia africana is a heavy branched aromatic perennial shrub native to the coast of the Cape Provinces of South Africa, found on coastal dunes and in nearby rocky hills up to 600 m elevation. It grows to 60–90 cm, with round grayish stems covered with hairs that release a strong scent when brushed. The leaves are a soft grey-green, lighter on the underside, and elliptical shaped. The inflorescences reach 30 cm long, with 2-6 flowers in each whorl, ranging from pale blue to pale violet or pink.

The species was originally named by Carl Linnaeus in 1753 as Salvia africana caerulea, but as this name has two specific epithets, it is contrary to Article 23.6(c) of the International Code of Nomenclature for algae, fungi, and plants, and has been corrected to Salvia africana. The incorrect form Salvia africana-caerulea will also be found.

== See also ==
- List of Lamiaceae of South Africa
