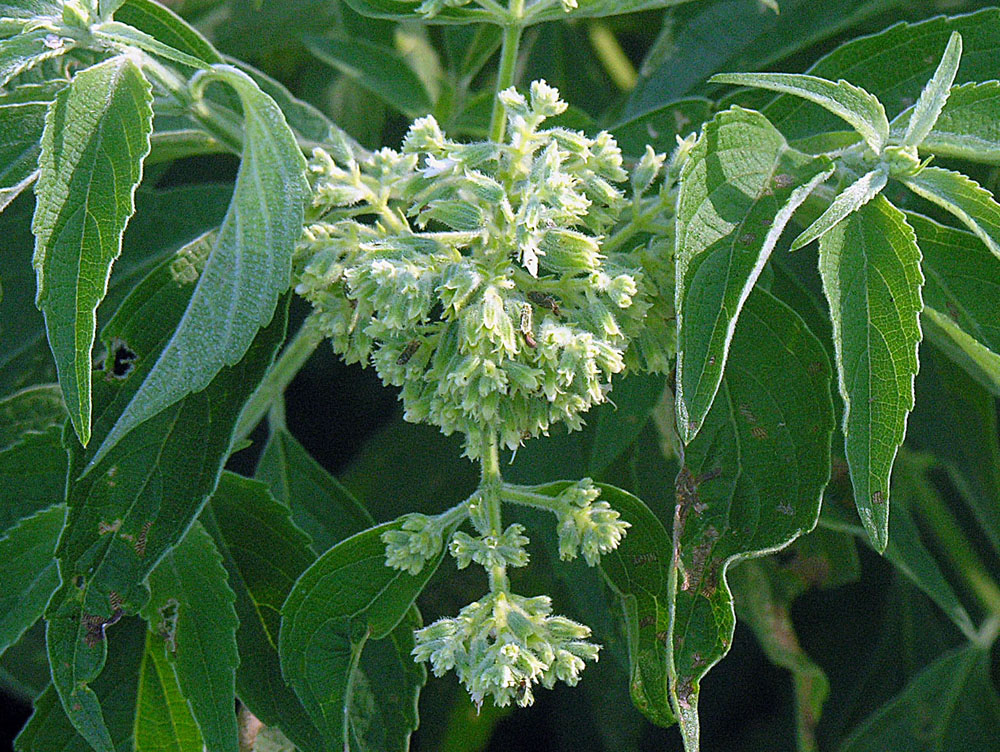

Scientific classification
- Kingdom: Plantae
- Clade: Tracheophytes
- Clade: Angiosperms
- Clade: Eudicots
- Clade: Asterids
- Order: Lamiales
- Family: Lamiaceae
- Subfamily: Nepetoideae
- Tribe: Ocimeae
- Genus: Hoslundia; Vahl
- Species: H. opposita

Binomial name
- Hoslundia opposita Vahl

Synonyms
- Haaslundia Schumach. & Thonn.; Micranthes Bertol. (1858), non Haw. (1812); Hoslundia verticillata Vahl; Hoslundia oppositifolia P.Beauv.; Hoslundia decumbens Benth.; Orthosiphon physocalycinus A.Rich.; Micranthes menthoides Bertol.; Premna longipes Baker; Clerodendrum micranthum Gilli

= Hoslundia =

Genus of flowering plants

Hoslundia is a genus of flowering plant in the family Lamiaceae, first described in 1804. It contains only one known species, Hoslundia opposita. It is widespread across much of sub-Saharan Africa.

== Description ==
Spreading, erect or subscandent shrub-like perennial herb up to 3–4 m tall, often regenerating and flowering after fire. Stems and branches sharply 4-angled; branches opposite. Leaves with strong and rather unpleasant smell; petiolate, opposite or sometimes ternate, blade grey-green, ovate-lanceolate to ovate-elliptic, 35-70 x 18-25 mm; apex acute, base cuneate; velvety; margin serrate; petiole short. Flowers in terminal, rather lax panicles or racemes. Calyx 5-toothed, 4 mm long at flowering; teeth narrow, about 1 mm long; tube cylindric, becoming globose and fleshy in fruit. Corolla bilabiate, white or cream, 6–7 mm long; tube straight, subcylindric; upper lip short, erect, 1 mm long, 3-lobed; lower lip patent, a little longer. Fruit fleshy, ovoid, ribbed, bright orange when ripe; edible and are relished by birds.

== Distribution ==
Widespread in tropical Africa — Senegal to Eritrea and Somalia, through Africa south to South Africa and Madagascar.
