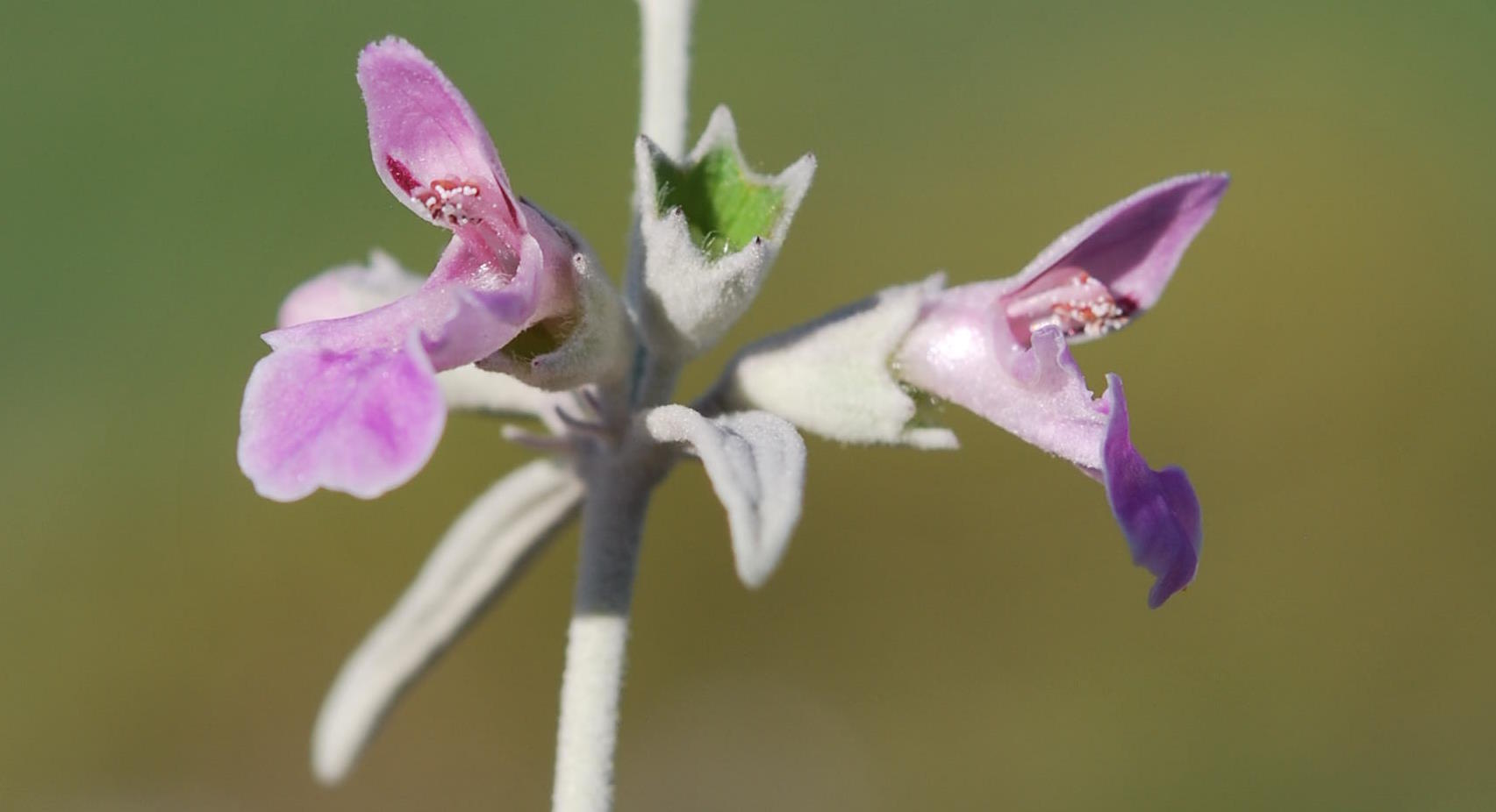

Conservation status
- Least Concern (SANBI Red List)

Scientific classification
- Kingdom: Plantae
- Clade: Tracheophytes
- Clade: Angiosperms
- Clade: Eudicots
- Clade: Asterids
- Order: Lamiales
- Family: Lamiaceae
- Genus: Stachys
- Species: S. rugosa

Binomial name
- Stachys rugosa Aiton

= Stachys rugosa =

Flowering plant endemic to Southern Africa

Stachys rugosa is a species of perennial herb in the genus Stachys.

== Distribution ==
Stachys rugosa can be found in Southern Africa, from Namibia and Namaqualand through the Karoo in Fynbos, Succulent Karoo, and Nama Karoo regions, and into Lesotho. In South Africa, it can be found in the Cape Provinces and the Free State. In grassland biomes, it can be found at altitudes of 180–2,900 m (590–9,510 ft).

== Conservation status ==
Stachys rugosa is classified as Least Concern.
