= Stachys spathulata =

Scientific classification
- Kingdom: Plantae
- Clade: Tracheophytes
- Clade: Angiosperms
- Clade: Eudicots
- Clade: Asterids
- Order: Lamiales
- Family: Lamiaceae
- Genus: Stachys
- Species: S. spathulata

Binomial name
- Stachys spathulata Burch. ex Benth.

Species of flowering plant

Stachys spathulata is a species of flowering plant in the mint family, Lamiaceae, native to southern Africa.

== Description ==
This species is a perennial rhizomatous herb or small subshrub, branching near the base and growing 80–250 mm (3.1–9.8 in) tall, occasionally reaching 300 mm (12 in). The stems are erect or ascending, often decumbent at the base, and are densely covered with whitish stellate hairs, except on older growth.

The leaves are crowded, sessile or nearly so, with linear to linear-spathulate blades 15–50 mm (0.59–1.97 in) long. They are often folded along the midrib and densely grey-white felted on both surfaces, sometimes darker above. The leaf margins are entire, with rounded tips and narrowed to slightly clasping bases.

The flowers are borne in a short spike of few to several small whorls, each with two to four flowers. The calyx is densely grey and felted, 4–7 mm (0.16–0.28 in) long. The corolla is pink to mauve, with a short tube and a spreading lower lip.

== Distribution and habitat ==
Stachys spathulata occurs from Namibia and Botswana through the Northern Cape, North West, western Free State, and northern KwaZulu-Natal, extending into Mozambique. It grows on heavy soils in depressions, along river banks, and in watercourses, typically under arid to semi-arid conditions.
