= Stachys linearis =

Scientific classification
- Kingdom: Plantae
- Clade: Tracheophytes
- Clade: Angiosperms
- Clade: Eudicots
- Clade: Asterids
- Order: Lamiales
- Family: Lamiaceae
- Genus: Stachys
- Species: S. linearis

Binomial name
- Stachys linearis Burch. ex Benth.

Species of flowering plant

Stachys linearis is a species of flowering plant in the mint family, Lamiaceae, native to southern Africa.

== Description ==
This species is a spreading or erect, branched shrublet 0.2–0.4 m (7.9 in – 1 ft 3.7 in) tall, with a strong woody taproot. The stems are decumbent to erect and densely covered with whitish stellate hairs, becoming partly hairless with age.

The leaves are sessile and form an interpetiolar ridge. The blades are linear, rarely linear-lanceolate, 15–45 mm (0.59–1.77 in) long, channelled above and often folded along the midrib. Both surfaces are densely and finely yellowish-grey felted, with entire margins and gradually tapering bases and apices.

The flowers are arranged in few to several small whorls, each bearing two, rarely four, flowers. The calyx is densely grey and felted, 5–8 mm (0.20–0.31 in) long. The corolla is pink to mauve or purplish, with a relatively long tube and a spreading lower lip.

== Distribution and habitat ==
Stachys linearis occurs in the eastern central Karoo, extending into the south-western Free State and the mountains of the north-eastern Northern Cape, with isolated populations in the Sutherland and Clanwilliam districts. It is locally common on flats and particularly on dolerite hills.
