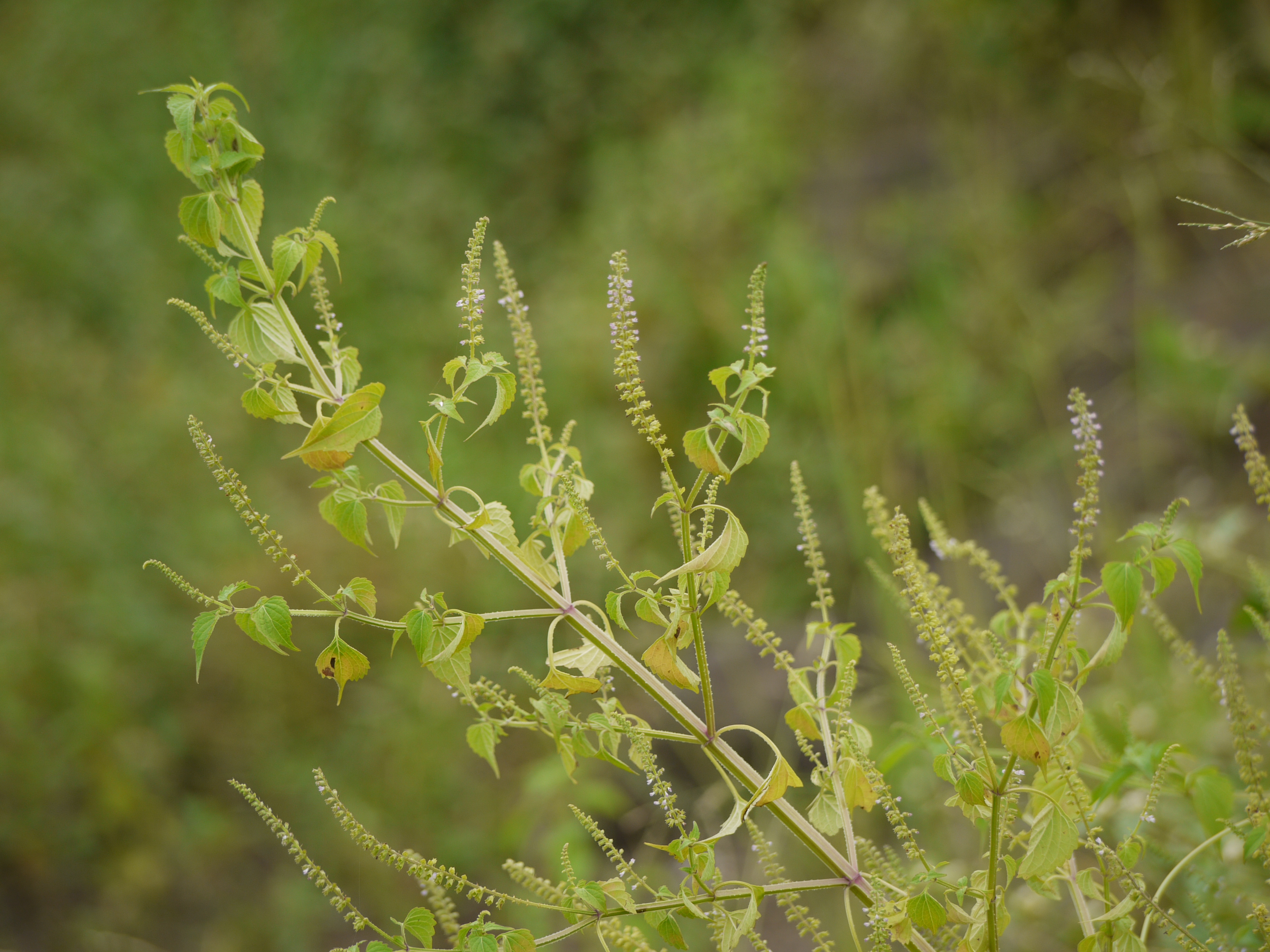

Scientific classification
- Kingdom: Plantae
- Clade: Tracheophytes
- Clade: Angiosperms
- Clade: Eudicots
- Clade: Asterids
- Order: Lamiales
- Family: Lamiaceae
- Subfamily: Nepetoideae
- Tribe: Ocimeae
- Genus: Basilicum; Moench
- Species: B. polystachyon

Binomial name
- Basilicum polystachyon (L.) Moench

Synonyms
- Lumnitzera Jacq. ex Spreng. 1825 not Willd. 1803; Moschosma Rchb.; Perxo Raf.; Lehmannia Jacq. ex Jacq.f. 1844 not Spreng. 1817 nor Tratt. 1824; Ocimum polystachyon L.; Ocimum moschatum Salisb.; Lumnitzera polystachyon (L.) J.Jacq. ex Spreng.; Moschosma polystachyon (L.) Benth.; Perxo polystachyon (L.) Raf.; Plectranthus parviflorus R.Br. 1810 not Willd. 1806 nor Spreng. 1806 nor Gürke 1898; Plectranthus micranthus Spreng.; Ocimum dimidiatum Schumach. & Thonn.; Moschosma dimidiatum (Schumach. & Thonn.) Benth.; Lehmannia ocymoidea Jacq. ex Steud.; Ocimum tashiroi Hayata

= Basilicum =

Genus of flowering plants

Basilicum is a genus of plants in the family Lamiaceae, first described in 1802. It contains only one known species, Basilicum polystachyon, native to Africa, Madagascar, southern Asia (Saudi Arabia, India, China, Indochina, Borneo, Philippines, etc.), New Guinea, Australia, and various islands of the Pacific and Indian Oceans.
