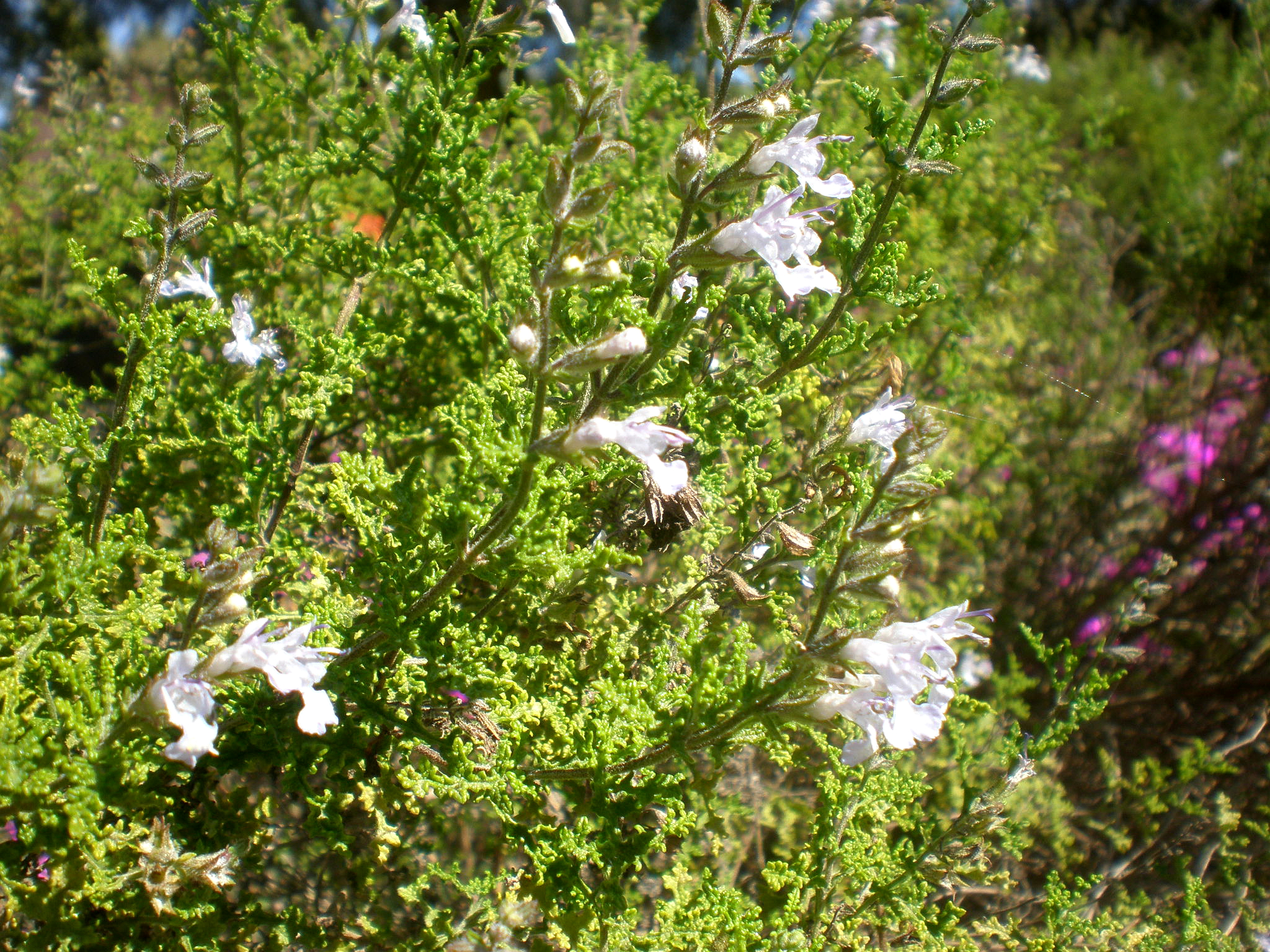
- Salvia namaensis at the Jardín Botánico in Barcelona

Conservation status
- Least Concern (SANBI Red List)

Scientific classification
- Kingdom: Plantae
- Clade: Embryophytes
- Clade: Tracheophytes
- Clade: Spermatophytes
- Clade: Angiosperms
- Clade: Eudicots
- Clade: Asterids
- Order: Lamiales
- Family: Lamiaceae
- Genus: Salvia
- Species: S. namaensis

Binomial name
- Salvia namaensis Schinz

= Salvia namaensis =

Species of shrub

Salvia namaensis (Nama sage) is an evergreen perennial shrub native to a limited area in Namibia and a wide area of South Africa (the Cape Provinces and the Free State). It is typically found growing on rocky slopes, shales, limestone hills, and sandy soils at 1,000 to 5,000 feet elevation.

The specific epithet namaensis probably refers to the Nama tribe which is indigenous to Namaqualand, the region in Namibia where the plant grows.

Salvia namaensis is a slightly woody shrub that reaches 3 feet tall and wide. The small leaves (0.75 inch) are irregular and pinnatifid, giving the plant an airy appearance. The leaves are yellow-green, along with the new stems and calyx. The short inflorescences, about 4 inches long, have 2 to 6 flowers growing in each whorl. Flowering is typically light, with white or very pale blue corollas that are about 0.6 inches long. There are reportedly some that have mauve flowers.
