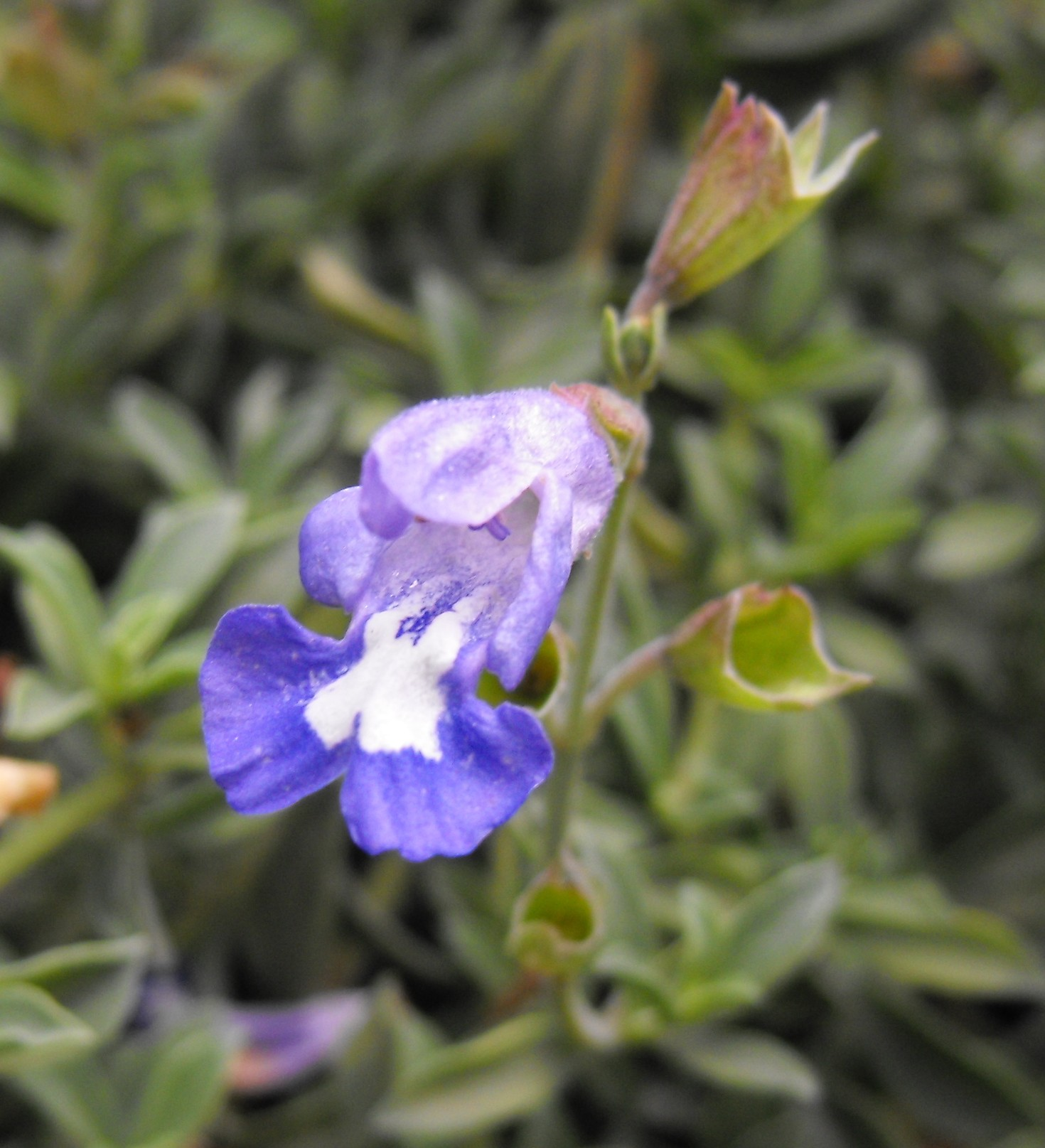

Conservation status
- Least Concern (SANBI Red List)

Scientific classification
- Kingdom: Plantae
- Clade: Tracheophytes
- Clade: Angiosperms
- Clade: Eudicots
- Clade: Asterids
- Order: Lamiales
- Family: Lamiaceae
- Genus: Salvia
- Species: S. muirii

Binomial name
- Salvia muirii L.Bol.

= Salvia muirii =

Species of shrub

Salvia muirii (Muir's sage) is an evergreen perennial shrub native to limited areas east of the Cape of Good Hope and Mossel Bay on the southern coast of South Africa. It grows in an area influenced by the climate of the Indian Ocean, on rolling hills between 200 and 1000 feet elevation. The plant was first collected by Dr. John Muir, a Scottish physician and plant collector who spent many years in South Africa. Muir wrote to the botanist Harriet Margaret Louisa Bolus, who named the plant after him.

Salvia muirii reaches 2 feet tall in its native habitat, less in cultivation. It grows into a stiff erect shrub, with small branches and tiny .75 inch olive-green leaves. The leaves appear smaller because each one is slightly folded along the middle. When crushed, they give off an aroma described as "reminiscent of a medicine cabinet" or of Vicks. The short inflorescences hold violet-blue flowers in whorls of two or three. The lower lip of the flower has a prominent white beeline, while the upper lip is short, straight, and one color.
