= Stachys rehmannii =

Conservation status
- Least Concern (SANBI Red List)

Scientific classification
- Kingdom: Plantae
- Clade: Tracheophytes
- Clade: Angiosperms
- Clade: Eudicots
- Clade: Asterids
- Order: Lamiales
- Family: Lamiaceae
- Genus: Stachys
- Species: S. rehmannii

Binomial name
- Stachys rehmannii Skan

Species of shrub

Stachys rehmannii, the Limpopo woundwort, is a species of hedgenettle endemic to South Africa's Limpopo province.

== Description ==
This species is a perennial herb with creeping, branching stems that can grow up to 50 cm (20 in) long. The stems are sparsely to densely covered with short, star-shaped hairs.

The leaves are borne on short stalks and have fairly thick, broadly ovate blades, 10–22 mm (0.39–0.87 in) long. Both surfaces are densely grey and hairy, with a net-like pattern of veins. The leaves have a rounded to blunt tip, a deeply heart-shaped base, and evenly scalloped margins.

The flowers are arranged in a spike that is loose at the base and denser towards the tip. Most whorls contain two flowers, occasionally up to six. The bracts are leaf-like below and become smaller higher up. The calyx is densely hairy.

The corolla is white to rosy, with a purplish mark in the throat, and has a short tube and two lips, the lower lip longer and held horizontally.

=== Identification ===
Stachys rehmannii′s leaves appear greyer than other members of the Stachys aethiopica Complex.

== Distribution and habitat ==
Stachys rehmannii grows in Limpopo among rocks in mountain grassland at altitudes of 1,300–2,200 m (4,300–7,200 ft).

== Etymology ==
The species epithet honours the Polish-born geographer, geomorphologist, and botanist Anton Rehmann, who collected over 9000 botanical specimens in South Africa on separate visits to the Cape, Orange Free State, and Colony of Natal (1875–1877) and the Transvaal (1879–1880). He collected the species′ type specimen in the Woodbush Forest near Polokwane.

== See also ==
- List of Lamiaceae of South Africa
