= Salvia granitica =

Scientific classification
- Kingdom: Plantae
- Clade: Tracheophytes
- Clade: Angiosperms
- Clade: Eudicots
- Clade: Asterids
- Order: Lamiales
- Family: Lamiaceae
- Genus: Salvia
- Species: S. granitica

Binomial name
- Salvia granitica Hochst.

Species of flowering plant

Salvia granitica is a species of sage commonly called the granite sage. It is endemic to South Africa′s, Western Cape province, where it grows on stony slopes in two far-removed locations – in the north, the Olifants River Mountains in the Koue Bokkeveld and, in the south, the Hemel-en-Aarde Valley between Hermanus and Caledon. It has no apparent affinity to any other Cape sage.

== Description ==
Salvia granitica is a stoloniferous perennial with a woody rootstock. Stems are erect to ascending, up to 60 cm (24 in) tall, little branched, and four-angled; they are nearly hairless below, with a few spreading white hairs, and more finely hairy above with occasional glandular hairs.

Leaves are simple, linear to linear-oblanceolate, 3–5 cm (1.2–2.0 in) long, usually entire and mostly glabrous above, with long white non-glandular hairs and oil glands beneath; they are sessile or taper into a short petiole.

The inflorescence is usually unbranched, bearing 5–9 two-flowered verticils, spaced below and more closely set above. Floral leaves are small and ovate-acuminate, with minute bracts. Flowers are borne on erect to spreading pedicels up to 6 mm (0.24 in) long.

The calyx is narrow and tubular to campanulate, 10–12 mm (0.39–0.47 in) long, nine-veined and hairy, with a truncate upper lip and two long teeth on the lower lip.

The corolla is a light mauve-pink, about 2 cm (0.8 in) long, with a falcate hood and a slightly exserted tube. Staminal connectives are elongate, with fertile lower anthers.

Salvia granitica flowers in November and December.
