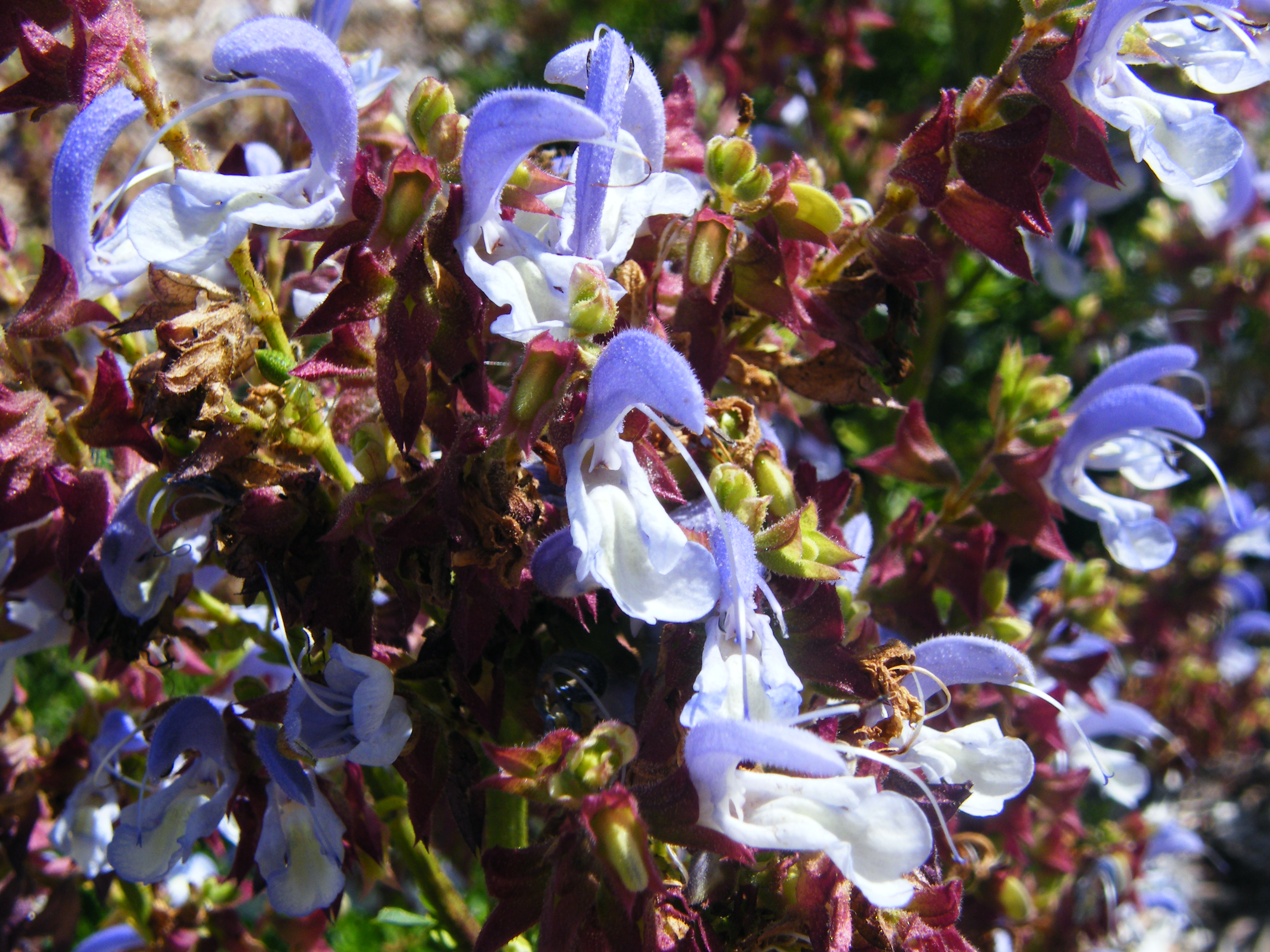

Conservation status
- Least Concern (SANBI Red List)

Scientific classification
- Kingdom: Plantae
- Clade: Tracheophytes
- Clade: Angiosperms
- Clade: Eudicots
- Clade: Asterids
- Order: Lamiales
- Family: Lamiaceae
- Genus: Salvia
- Species: S. chamelaeagnea

Binomial name
- Salvia chamelaeagnea K. Bergius

= Salvia chamelaeagnea =

Species of flowering plant

Salvia chamelaeagnea is a species of flowering plant in genus Salvia, known as sages. It is endemic to South Africa, where it grows on the western coastline of the Cape of Good Hope. It is a shrubby perennial herb up to 6 feet (1.8 metres) tall and 4 feet (1.2 metres) wide. It bears three-quarters-inch (two-centimetre) light violet-blue flowers with pale lower lips and white throats. The small, green leaves release a slight medicinal odor when brushed. In the wild, the plant grows in sandy soil in streambeds, open fields, and roadsides. It is cultivated for gardens.

Common names for the plant in Afrikaans include Afrikaanse salie and bloublommetjiesalie.

== See also ==
- List of Lamiaceae of South Africa
