= Salvia repens =

Scientific classification
- Kingdom: Plantae
- Clade: Tracheophytes
- Clade: Angiosperms
- Clade: Eudicots
- Clade: Asterids
- Order: Lamiales
- Family: Lamiaceae
- Genus: Salvia
- Species: S. repens

Binomial name
- Salvia repens Burch. ex Benth.

Species of flowering plant

Salvia repens (creeping sage) is a herbaceous perennial native to South Africa (the Cape Provinces, KwaZulu-Natal, the Free State and the Northern Provinces) and Lesotho, growing at elevations between 1,500 and 8,000 feet in open country and amongst shrubs. It has also adapted to grassland, grassy slopes, and shale banks. It was described and named by botanist George Bentham in 1833, based on a description by William John Burchell, with repens referring to the creeping rootstock.

Salvia repens is small and upright, reaching 2 feet, high with branched erect stems. The slender oblong leaves appear torn on the edges. The 1 foot inflorescence has spaced whorls of 6-8 flowers, which vary in color from purple or deep blue to white. The calyx and leaves have oil glands the give off an herblike fragrance when brushed. In cultivation it can spread rapidly and take over a large area.
