= Thorncroftia media =

Conservation status
- Least Concern (SANBI Red List)

Scientific classification
- Kingdom: Plantae
- Clade: Tracheophytes
- Clade: Angiosperms
- Clade: Eudicots
- Clade: Asterids
- Order: Lamiales
- Family: Lamiaceae
- Genus: Thorncroftia
- Species: T. media

Binomial name
- Thorncroftia media Codd

Species of flowering plant

Thorncroftia media, the Wolkberg whistlesweet, is an extremely rare species of Thorncroftia, a flowering plant in the mint family, Lamiaceae. It is endemic to South Africa's Limpopo province, where it grows along forest margins on rocky mountain slopes. For 50 years, it was known only from the original gathering in the Wolkberg mountains, but in March 2025, after years of searching, two populations were discovered in highly rugged terrain south-west of the village of Trichardtsdal. It is listed as Critically Rare (Least Concern) by SANBI.

== Description ==
Thorncroftia media is a semi-succulent suffrutex growing to about 60 cm (24 in) tall, branching from the base. The stems are erect and sparsely branched, and are covered in a mixture of glandular hairs and fine, branched, non-glandular hairs.

The leaves are opposite, ovate to elliptic, typically 30–55 mm (1.2–2.2 in) long and 13–35 mm (0.51–1.38 in) wide. The veins are sunken on the upper surface and strongly raised below, forming a network of shallow recesses. Both leaf surfaces are densely hairy and gland-dotted. The leaf tip is rounded, the base wedge-shaped, and the margins bear about six shallow scallops on the distal half of each side. The petiole is relatively long, usually 22–28 mm (0.87–1.10 in).

The inflorescence is a sparse, terminal panicle, with additional short racemes arising from the upper leaf axils. The main axis may reach up to 26 cm (10 in) in length. Bracts are leaf-like near the base of the inflorescence and become smaller towards the tip. Flower stalks (pedicels) are 2–3 mm (0.08–0.12 in) long.

The calyx is 5–7 mm (0.20–0.28 in) long at flowering and bears both sessile and stalked glandular hairs. It is initially mauve and lilac, later becoming red and pink. The upper calyx tooth curves upward and is larger than the remaining four, which are broadly triangular and sharply pointed.

The corolla is lilac, with a narrow, slightly curved and laterally compressed tube about 20–25 mm (0.8–1.0 in) long. The upper lobes are broadly oblong to almost circular and marked with blue to purple lines, while the lateral lobes curve downward and forward. The lower lobe is boat-shaped and becomes fully reflexed as the flower opens.

The stamens are unequal in length, with dark purple anthers and dark yellow pollen. The style is initially straight, then curves upward, ending in a purple-tipped stigma.

T. media flowers in April.

It is similar to T. succulenta, but its leaves are quite a lot larger and the scallops along its leaf margins very shallow by comparison. Distinguishing it from T. coddii and T. lotteri involves a close comparison of the types of hairs on stems and leaves, but, fortunately, none of these species overlaps geographically.

== See also ==
- List of Lamiaceae of South Africa
