= Equilabium =

Scientific classification
- Kingdom: Plantae
- Clade: Tracheophytes
- Clade: Angiosperms
- Clade: Eudicots
- Clade: Asterids
- Order: Lamiales
- Family: Lamiaceae
- Tribe: Ocimeae
- Genus: Equilabium; Mwany., A.J.Paton & Culham

Genus of flowering plants

Equilabium is a genus of flowering plants in the family Lamiaceae. It was split off from the genus Plectranthus in 2018 as the result of a molecular phylogenetic study. Most species are native to Africa, with two found in the Indian subcontinent.

== Description ==
Species of Equilabium are herbaceous or soft-wooded shrubs, rarely woody shrubs. The herbaceous species may be annual or perennial. The leaves are opposite. The inflorescences are "thryses" – compound structures in which the flowers are arranged on secondary branches. Individual flowers have stalks (pedicels). The sepals form a two-lipped funnel shape, the upper lip having four lobes, the lower lip one lobe. The petals form a two-lipped tube, with an S-shaped basal portion. There are four stamens, whose filaments are not fused together. The style is divided into two parts (bifid). The nutlets are ovoid.

Equilabium and Plectranthus species are distinguished from Coleus by having the stem (pedicel) of the calyx attached symmetrically to the base of the calyx tube, rather than opposite the upper lip, and having the corolla lobes more or less equal in length. Equilabium species can be distinguished from Plectranthus by the truncated shape of the throat of the calyx and by the usually S-shaped tube of the corolla, which is parallel-sided at the base.

== Taxonomy ==
The genus Equilabium was first described in 2018 as the result of a molecular phylogenetic study. Equilabium was split off from the genus Plectranthus, which was discovered not to be monophyletic. Only the names of the genus and the type species, Equilabium laxiflorum, were formally published at the time. The names of 41 more species were published in 2019.

=== Phylogeny ===
In 2019, Paton et al. published a summary cladogram for the subtribe Plectranthinae, based on an earlier 2018 study. The new genus Equilabium was established and Coleus revived. In the version below, the three genera accepted in these studies that were formerly included in a broad circumscription of Plectranthus are highlighted.

- Tribe Ocimeae
  - Subtribe Ociminae
  - - Subtribe Plectranthinae
      - - Alvesia (3 spp.)
        - - Aeollanthus (42 spp.)
          - - - Tetradenia + Thorncroftia (29 spp.)
              - Plectranthus (72 spp.)
            - Capitanopsis (6 spp.)
            - Equilabium (42 spp.)
      - Coleus (294 spp.)

=== Species ===
Sources:

- Equilabium acaule (Brummitt & Seyani) Mwany., Culham & A.J.Paton (syn. Plectranthus acaulis) – Malawi to Zambia (Nyika Plateau)
- Equilabium agnewii (Lukhoba & A.J.Paton) Mwany. & A.J.Paton (syn. Plectranthus agnewii) – E. Tropical Africa
- Equilabium annuum (A.J.Paton) Mwany. & A.J.Paton (syn. Plectranthus annuus) – S. Tanzania to Mozambique
- Equilabium caespitosum (Lukhoba & A.J.Paton) Mwany. & A.J.Paton (syn. Plectranthus caespitosus) – Kenya to N. Tanzania
- Equilabium candelabriforme (Launert) Mwany. & A.J.Paton (syn. Plectranthus candelabriformis) – Tanzania to N. Namibia
- Equilabium cinereum (A.J.Paton) Mwany. & A.J.Paton (syn. Plectranthus cinereus) – Kenya to Tanzania
- Equilabium dissectum (Brenan) Mwany. & A.J.Paton (syn. Plectranthus dissectus) – S. Malawi
- Equilabium dolomiticum (Codd) Mwany. & A.J.Paton (syn. Plectranthus dolomiticus) – Zimbabwe to Limpopo
- Equilabium equisetiforme (E.A.Bruce) Mwany. & A.J.Paton (syn. Coleus equisetiformis) – Tanzania to N. Zambia
- Equilabium flaccidum (Vatke) Mwany. & A.J.Paton (syns Coleus flaccidus, Plectranthus flaccidus) – S. Somalia to Mozambique, Comoros
- Equilabium glandulosum (Hook. f.) Mwany. & A.J.Paton (syn. Plectranthus glandulosus) – Widespread in Tropical Africa
- Equilabium goetzei (Gürke) Mwany. & A.J.Paton (syn. Plectranthus goetzei) – SW. Tanzania to Zambia
- Equilabium gracile (Suess.) Mwany. & A.J.Paton (syn. Plectranthus gracilis) – S. Tanzania to S. Tropical Africa
- Equilabium intrusum (Briq.) Mwany. & A.J.Paton (syn. Plectranthus intrusus) – Democratic Republic of the Congo
- Equilabium janthinothryx (Lebrun & L. Touss) Mwany. & A.J.Paton (syn. Plectranthus janthinothryx) – Democratic Republic of the Congo and Uganda
- Equilabium jebel-marrae (Wickens & B.Mathew) A.J.Paton (syn. Plectranthus jebel-marrae) – Sudan
- Equilabium kamerunense (Gürke) Mwany. & A.J.Paton (syn. Plectranthus kamerunensis) – Nigeria to Cameroon, E. Tropical Africa
- Equilabium laxiflorum (Benth.) Mwany. & A.J.Paton (syn. Plectranthus laxiflorus) – Ethiopia to South Africa
- Equilabium longipes (Baker) Mwany. & A.J.Paton (syn. Plectranthus longipes) – Eritrea to Rwanda and Tanzania
- Equilabium mafiense (A.J.Paton) Mwany. & A.J.Paton (syn. Plectranthus mafiensis) – Tanzania (Mafia I.)
- Equilabium masukense (Baker) Mwany. & A.J.Paton (syn. Plectranthus masukensis) – Kenya to N. Zambia
- Equilabium megafolium (A.J.Paton) Mwany. & A.J.Paton (syn. Plectranthus megafolius) – Tanzania (type)
- Equilabium molle (Aiton) Mwany. & A.J.Paton (syn. Ocimum molle, Plectranthus mollis) – Indian Subcontinent to N. Myanmar
- Equilabium orbiculare (Gürke) Mwany. & A.J.Paton (syn. Plectranthus orbicularis) – E. Tanzania (incl. Zanzibar, Pemba)
- Equilabium parvum (Oliv.) Mwany. & A.J.Paton (syn. Plectranthus parvus) – Uganda to N. Zambia
- Equilabium pauciflorum (Baker) Mwany. & A.J.Paton (syn. Plectranthus pauciflorus) – Democratic Republic of the Congo, East Africa, Zambia
- Equilabium petiolare (Benth.) Mwany. & A.J.Paton (syn. Plectranthus petiolaris) – S. Mozambique to South Africa
- Equilabium pinetorum (A.J.Paton) Mwany. & A.J.Paton (syn. Plectranthus pinetorum) – Malawi and E. Zimbabwe
- Equilabium pubescens (Baker) Mwany. & A.J.Paton (syn. Plectranthus pubescens) – SW. Tanzania to Mozambique
- Equilabium pulcherissimum (A.J.Paton) Mwany. & A.J.Paton (syn. Plectranthus pulcherissimus) – Democratic Republic of the Congo and Zambia
- Equilabium radiatum (A.J.Paton) Mwany. & A.J.Paton (syn. Plectranthus radiatus) – S. Tanzania
- Equilabium regale C.J.Fourie & Hankey – South Africa
- Equilabium rungwense (A.J.Paton) Mwany. & A.J.Paton (syn. Plectranthus rungwensis) – Tanzania (Mt. Rungwe)
- Equilabium scopulicola (A.J.Paton) Mwany. & A.J.Paton (syn. Plectranthus scopulicola) – Tanzania (W. Usambara Mts.)
- Equilabium selukwense (N.E.Br.) Mwany. & A.J.Paton (syn. Plectranthus selukwensis) – Zambia to Zimbabwe
- Equilabium spananthum (A.J.Paton, Friis & Sebsebe) A.J.Paton (syn. Plectranthus spananthus) – Ethiopia
- Equilabium stenophyllum (Baker) Mwany. & A.J.Paton (syn. Plectranthus stenophyllus) – S. Tanzania to S. Tropical Africa
- Equilabium stenosiphon (Baker) Mwany. & A.J.Paton (syn. Plectranthus stenosiphon) – S. Malawi to C. Mozambique and Zimbabwe
- Equilabium stoltzii (Gilli) Mwany. & A.J.Paton (syn. Plectranthus stolzii) – SW. Tanzania to N. Malawi
- Equilabium subincisum (Benth.) Mwany., Smitha & A.J.Paton (syn. Plectranthus subincisus) – S. India, Sri Lanka?
- Equilabium vesiculare (A.J.Paton) Mwany. & A.J.Paton (syn. Plectranthus vesicularis) – Tanzania to N. Mozambique
- Equilabium viphyense (Brummitt & Seyani) Mwany., Culham & A.J.Paton (syn. Plectranthus viphyensis) – Tanzania to S. Tropical Africa
- Equilabium wollastonii (S.Moore) Mwany. & A.J. Paton (syn. Plectranthus wollastonii) – E. Central Tropical Africa to S. Kenya.
