= Henry George Flanagan =

South African-born botanist (1861-1919)

- Born: 22 January 1861; Komga, Cape Colony
- Died: 23 October 1919 (aged 58); Komga
- Known for: Collecting plants
- Spouse: Florence Sarah Reynolds
- Scientific career
- Fields: Botany

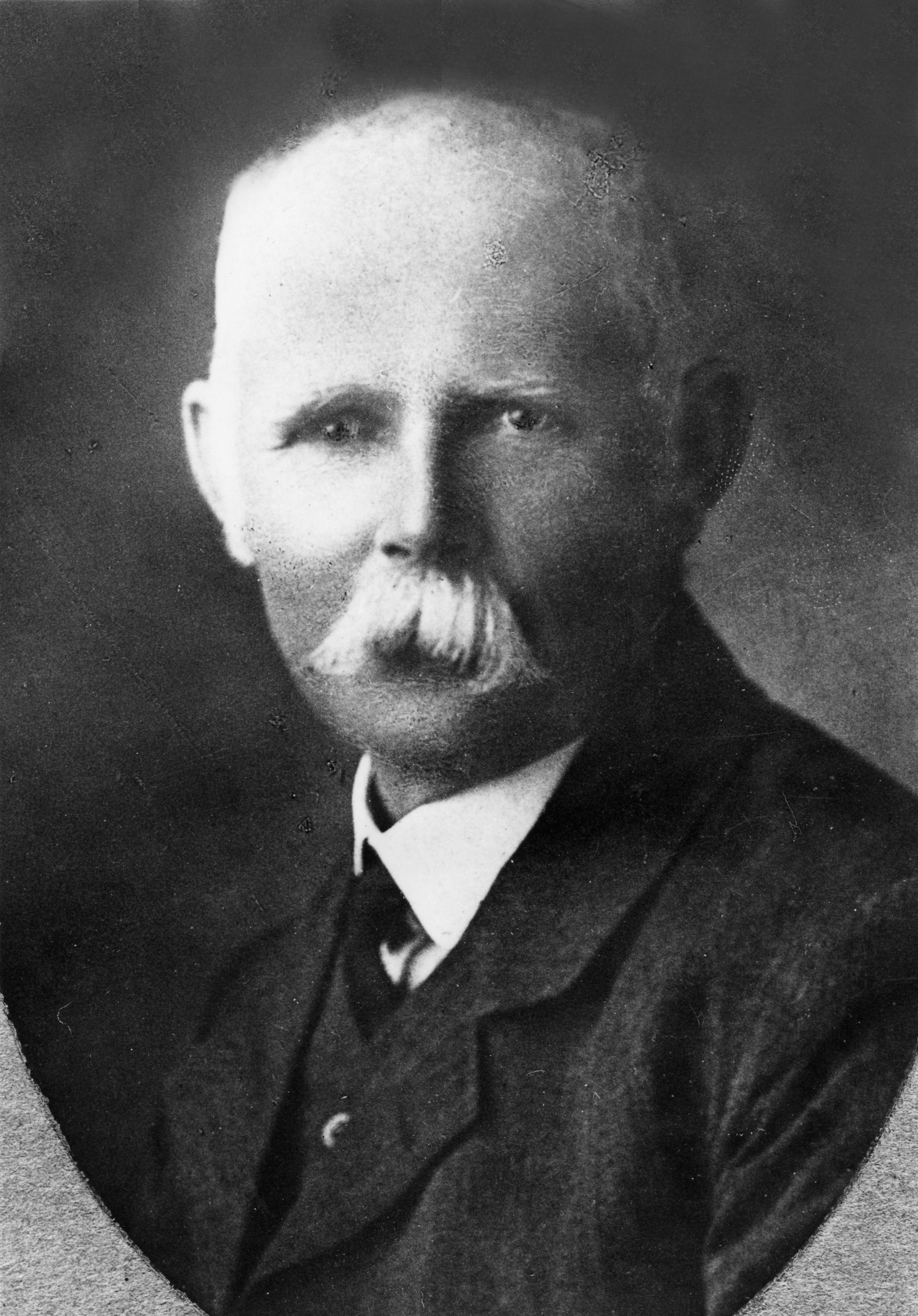

Henry George Flanagan (22 January 1861 – 23 October 1919) was a Cape Colony-born plant collector, traveller, botanist and farmer. He developed a renowned garden for native South African trees and rare exotic plants. A rare endemic of Eastern Cape, Greyia flanaganii is one of several plants named in his honour.

== Biography ==
Flanagan was born on 22 January 1861 in Komga, Cape Colony. He was the son of Irish immigrant George Millin Flanagan and Ann Pitt. He was the sixth of nine children and the oldest son. He went to public school in Komga, Cape Colony. He owned and farmed on Prospect Farm in the Komga District.

== Work life ==
Apart from citrus farming, Flanagan was a botanist. Early February 1889 he started collecting plants and carefully selected and preserved his specimens. He donated specimens to herbaria and other institutions, such as the Albany Museum in Grahamstown, Cape Colony, the Government's botanist in Cape Town and the Royal Botanic Gardens, Kew. Both the museum's director Selmar Schonland and the South African Government botanist Peter MacOwan recognised Flanagan's work. Schonland said: “he is a collector who excellently prepared specimens and embraced a number of type-specimens and rare plants which was not previously represented in our collection" MacOwan added his specimens to the South African Government Herbarium. Both Schonland and MacOwan were well respected botanists, recognized worldwide. Harry Bolus, a botanist, helped him with the specimens to England. Bolus with Flanagan's wife Florence accompanied him on trips. They travel and did research at the Great Kei River, Bethulie, Heilbron, Molteno, Aliwal North, Pondoland, Burgersdorp, Port St. Johns, Kimberley, Northern Cape, Lesotho, Robben Island, Rhodesia and Mont-Aux-Sources. He was also the writer of numerous books on plants.

== Organisations ==
Flanagan was elected a Fellow of the Linnean Society in 1898. In 1902 he became a lifelong member of the Southern Africa Association for the Advancement of Science.

== Family life ==
He married Florence Sarah Reynolds on 9 December 1890 in st Paul's Church in Komga. Florence was the daughter of Charles Francis Reynolds and Janet Natal Walker 1890. They had no children. He died in King William's Town on 23 October 1919.

== Plants named in his honour ==
The Greyia flanaganii, a spring flowering, South African shrub with bright red, bell shaped petals, is named after Flanagan. It was named the tree of the year in South Africa in 1998.

Other plants were:

- Bryopsis flanaganii
- Cassipourea flanaganii
- Cyrtanthus flanaganii
- Erica flanaganii
- Euphorbia flanaganii
- Gladiolus flanaganii
- Impatiens flanaganiae
- Protea flanaganii
- Raphionacme flanaganii
- Scolopia flanaganii
- Selago flanaganii
- Zaluzianskya flanaganii

Impatiens flanaganiae was named after his wife Florence discovered it at Port St. Johns.

== Legacy ==
The plants in his garden were donated out of his will to the South African Government. They were moved to the Union Buildings and planting area is called the Flanagan Arboretum.

== Notes and references ==
- Binnqüist, Citlalli López; Shanley, Patricia; Fantini, Alfredo Celso (2004). Riches of the Forest: Fruits, Remedies, and Handicrafts in Latin America. CIFOR. ISBN 978-979-3361-46-8.
- Coombes, Allen J. (2012). The A to Z of Plant Names: A Quick Reference Guide to 4000 Garden Plants. Timber Press. p. 155. ISBN 978-1-60469-398-0.
- Gunn, Mary; Codd, L. E. W. (1981). Botanical Exploration Southern Africa. CRC Press. ISBN 978-0-86961-129-6.
