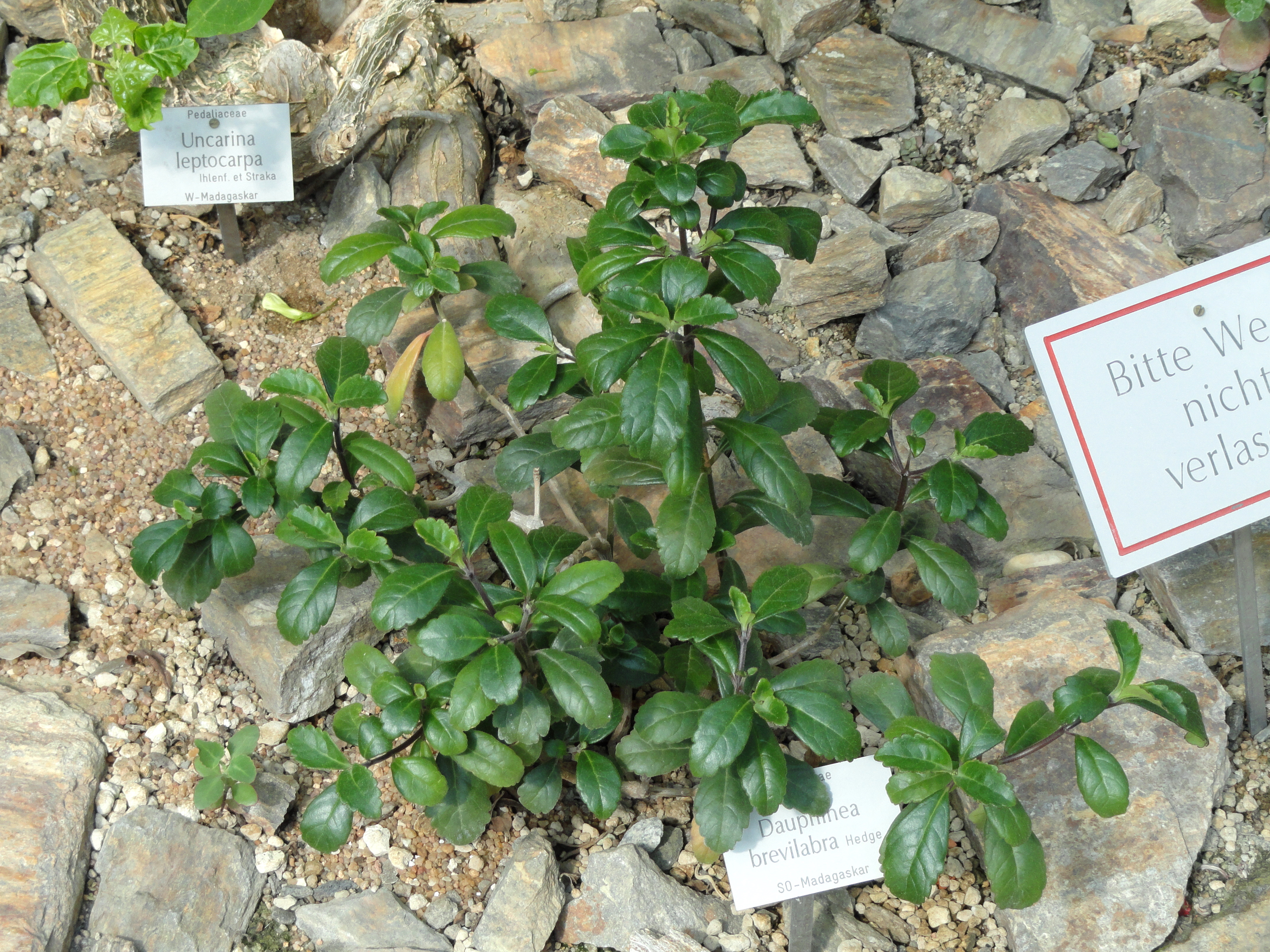
- Capitanopsis brevilabra

Scientific classification
- Kingdom: Plantae
- Clade: Tracheophytes
- Clade: Angiosperms
- Clade: Eudicots
- Clade: Asterids
- Order: Lamiales
- Family: Lamiaceae
- Subfamily: Nepetoideae
- Tribe: Ocimeae
- Genus: Capitanopsis; S.Moore

Type species
- Capitanopsis cloiselii S.Moore

Synonyms
- Dauphinea Hedge; Madlabium Hedge; Perrierastrum Guillaumin

= Capitanopsis =

Genus of flowering plants

Capitanopsis is a genus of plants in the family Lamiaceae, first described in 1916. It contains six known species, all endemic to Madagascar.

== Taxonomy ==
=== Phylogeny ===
In 2019, Paton et al. published a summary cladogram for the subtribe Plectranthinae, based on an earlier 2018 study. The formerly recognized monotypic genera Dauphinea, Madlabium and Perrierastrum were found to form a clade with three species placed in Capitanopsis, so were transferred to that genus. Capitanopsis was a sister of the newly established genus Equilabium.

- Tribe Ocimeae
  - Subtribe Ociminae
  - - Subtribe Plectranthinae
      - - Alvesia (3 spp.)
        - - Aeollanthus (42 spp.)
          - - - Tetradenia + Thorncroftia (29 spp.)
              - Plectranthus (72 spp.)
            - Capitanopsis (including Dauphinea, Madlabium and Perrierastrum; 6 spp.)
            - Equilabium (42 spp.)
      - Coleus (294 spp.)

=== Species ===
Paton et al. (2018) recognize six species:

- Capitanopsis albida (Baker) Hedge
- Capitanopsis angustifolia (Moldenke) Capuron
- Capitanopsis brevilabra (Hedge) Mwany., A.J.Paton & Culham, syn. Dauphinea brevilabra
- Capitanopsis cloiselii S.Moore
- Capitanopsis magentea (Hedge) Mwany., A.J.Paton & Culham, syn. Madlabium magenteum
- Capitanopsis oreophila (Guillaumin) Mwany., A.J.Paton & Culham, syns. Plectanthus bipinnatus, Perrierastrum oreophilum
