= Equilabium dolomiticum =

Conservation status
- Least Concern (SANBI Red List)

Scientific classification
- Kingdom: Plantae
- Clade: Tracheophytes
- Clade: Angiosperms
- Clade: Eudicots
- Clade: Asterids
- Order: Lamiales
- Family: Lamiaceae
- Genus: Equilabium
- Species: E. dolomiticum

Binomial name
- Equilabium dolomiticum (Codd) Mwany. & A.J.Paton

Synonyms
- Plectranthus dolomiticus Codd

Species of flowering plant

Equilabium dolomiticum, commonly called the dolomite slippermint, is a species of flowering plant in the family Lamiaceae. It is endemic to South Africa's Limpopo province and is listed as Critically Rare (Least Concern) in the Red List of South African Plants.

== Description ==
This species is a perennial, semi-succulent herb forming a low, spreading plant up to 0.3 m (1 ft 0 in) tall and roughly as wide. It grows from tuberous roots. The stems lie along the ground or spread outward, and are covered with a fine greyish felt.

The leaves are borne on stalks 15–30 mm (0.59–1.18 in) long. The blades are broadly oval, semi-succulent, and measure about 20–30 mm (0.79–1.18 in) long and 18–30 mm (0.71–1.18 in) wide. They are mostly smooth, with tiny colourless gland dots on the underside. The leaf tips are rounded, the bases truncate, and the margins shallowly scalloped.

The flowering stems are simple or lightly branched, 70–130 mm (2.8–5.1 in) long. Flowers are arranged in small clusters of one to three, forming loose whorls of two to four flowers spaced 10–25 mm (0.39–0.98 in) apart.

The calyx is 5–6 mm (0.20–0.24 in) long in fruit, with broad teeth, the uppermost slightly larger, and covered in very fine hairs.

The corolla is mauve, 9–10 mm (0.35–0.39 in) long, with a gently curved tube and a concave lower lip that curves upwards. The stamens are free and about 2 mm (0.079 in) long.

Equilabium dolomiticum flowers from December to May.

=== Identification ===
Equilabium dolomiticum might be confused with Equilabium petiolare and Equilabium regale in the field were the three species overlapping geographically, but they do not. E. dolomiticum can, in any case, be distinguished from E. petiolare by its smaller flowers; smaller, semi-succulent leaves, and decumbent habit. It is also a much smaller plant than E. regale, which has a darker corolla and broader, thin-textured leaves.

== Distribution and habitat ==
Equilabium dolomiticum grows on dolomite, in humus-filled rock crevices in dry bushveld. It is known only from a difficult to access site in the vicinity of the Penge mine in Limpopo, South Africa.

== See also ==
- List of Lamiaceae of South Africa
