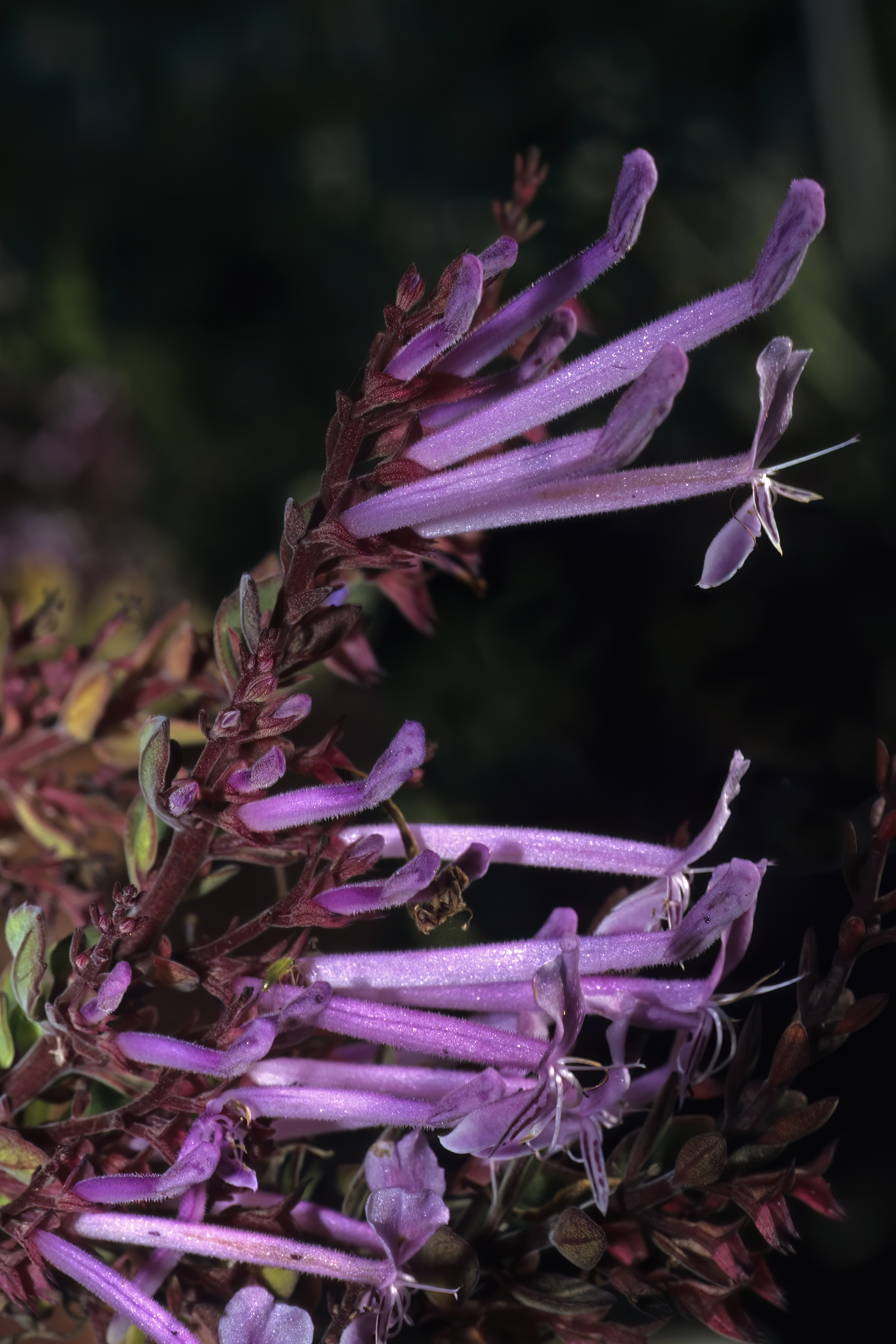

Conservation status
- Least Concern (SANBI Red List)

Scientific classification
- Kingdom: Plantae
- Clade: Tracheophytes
- Clade: Angiosperms
- Clade: Eudicots
- Clade: Asterids
- Order: Lamiales
- Family: Lamiaceae
- Genus: Thorncroftia
- Species: T. longiflora

Binomial name
- Thorncroftia longiflora N.E.Br.

= Thorncroftia longiflora =

Species of flowering plant

Thorncroftia longiflora is an endangered species of Thorncroftia commonly called the longflower whistlesweet. It is endemic to South Africa′s Mpumalanga province.

== Description ==
Thorncroftia longiflora is a semi-succulent, multi-stemmed suffrutex or small shrub, 30–80 cm (12–31 in) tall, arising from a thickened rootstock. Stems are sparsely branched, succulent at the base and brittle above, densely pubescent with glandular and non-glandular hairs.

Leaves are opposite or occasionally whorled, elliptic to obovate, 10–18 mm (0.39–0.71 in) long and 3–10 mm (0.12–0.39 in) wide, succulent and pubescent on both surfaces; the apex is obtuse, margins bear one to three small teeth near the upper third (rarely entire), and the petiole is 2–5 mm (0.08–0.20 in) long.

The inflorescence is a terminal panicle, sometimes with additional racemes from upper leaf axils, with single flowers in the axils of leaf-like bracts. The main axis is typically 16–25 cm (6.3–9.8 in) long. Flowers are borne on pedicels 4.5–6 mm (0.18–0.24 in) long, green at the base and darkening towards the tip. The calyx is 6–7 mm (0.24–0.28 in) long, green with a narrow maroon margin, densely glandular-pubescent; the upper lobe is broader than the others, and the remaining teeth are lanceolate.

The corolla is long and narrowly cylindrical, 40–46 mm (1.6–1.8 in) long, light lilac below and darker towards the lobes, with purple markings on the lateral lobes. The upper lobes are oblong, the lateral lobes narrowly oblong and sharply pointed, and the lower lobe is boat-shaped and becoming reflexed with age.

Stamens have light lilac filaments and dark purple anthers; pollen is orange-green. The lilac style elongates and becomes prominent after the stamens have recoiled.

T. longiflora flowers from February to July.

== Distribution ==
When N.E. Brown named the genus in 1912, T. longiflora was its sole species, and, in time, its geographic distribution came to be understood to be the largest. However, subpopulations in KwaZulu-Natal and Eswatini were later described as separate species (T. greenii in 2009 and T. malolotjaensis in 2025, respectively), and it is now believed to be confined to the immediate environs of the old Joe′s Luck Mine, on the Sheba Reef near Barberton, where it was first collected.

Illegal mining threatens this much-circumscribed area of occurrence, and the authors of the 2025 revision of Thorncroftia recommend the species be reclassified from Rare (Least Concern) to Critically Endangered in SANBI′s Red List of South African Plants.

== Etymology ==
The genus Thorncroftia is named for George Thorncroft (1857‒1934), an amateur botanist who collected extensively in the Barberton area. The species epithet refers to the length of the narrow corolla tube.

== See also ==
- List of Lamiaceae of South Africa
