= Equilabium regale =

Scientific classification
- Kingdom: Plantae
- Clade: Tracheophytes
- Clade: Angiosperms
- Clade: Eudicots
- Clade: Asterids
- Order: Lamiales
- Family: Lamiaceae
- Genus: Equilabium
- Species: E. regale

Binomial name
- Equilabium regale C.J.Fourie & Hankey

Species of flowering plant

Equilabium regale, the regal slippermint, is a species of flowering plant in the family Lamiaceae. It is endemic to South Africa's Mpumalanga province.

== Description ==
This species is a perennial, semi-succulent, branched herb forming a spreading to low-growing plant up to 0.5 m (1.6 ft) tall and 0.6 m (2.0 ft) across. It grows from a tuberous rootstock formed by a thickened basal stem. The stems are green with maroon markings when young, becoming dark brown with age, and are covered with fine hairs.

The leaves are borne on stalks 20–50 mm (0.8–2.0 in) long. The blades are thin-textured, lime green, oval to broadly oval, and measure about 30–80 mm (1.2–3.1 in) long and 30–85 mm (1.2–3.3 in) wide. They are sparsely hairy on both surfaces, with denser hairs along the veins beneath. The tips are rounded, the bases truncate to somewhat arrow-shaped, and the margins are scalloped.

The flowering stems are slender, terminal, and 60–100 mm (2.4–3.9 in) long, usually simple but sometimes branched near the base. Flowers are arranged in small clusters of one to three, forming loose whorls of two to five flowers spaced 10–25 mm (0.4–1.0 in) apart.

The calyx is about 2 mm (0.08 in) long when flowering and enlarges to about 7 mm (0.28 in) in fruit. It is sparsely hairy and becomes increasingly smooth with age.

The corolla is deep purple and about 15 mm (0.6 in) long. Its tube is sigmoid, expanding gradually towards the middle and then bending downwards. The upper lip is erect to slightly recurved and notched at the tip, while the lower lip is concave to almost straight. The four stamens are free and curve upwards near the anthers. The style is contained within the lower lip and is shortly divided at the tip.

The nutlets are broadly oval and pale brown, about 1 mm (0.04 in) long and 1.5 mm (0.06 in) wide.

Equilabium regale flowers from December to May.

=== Identification ===
Equilabium regale might be confused with Equilabium dolomiticum and Equilabium petiolare in the field were the three species overlapping geographically, but that is not the case. E. regale is found exclusively on granite while E. dolomiticum is registricted to dolomite. Both of these species form tuberous roots, but E. dolomiticum is a much smaller plant, with a lighter-coloured corolla and smaller, more narrow leaves.

E. petiolare meanwhile does not have tuberous roots and is larger than E. regale in several respects.

== Distribution and habitat ==
Equilabium regale is known from just one site south-east of White River in Mpumalanga, South Africa. It grows in semi-shaded crevices in granite boulders at elevations of 600–700 m (2,000–2,300 ft).

== See also ==
- List of Lamiaceae of South Africa
