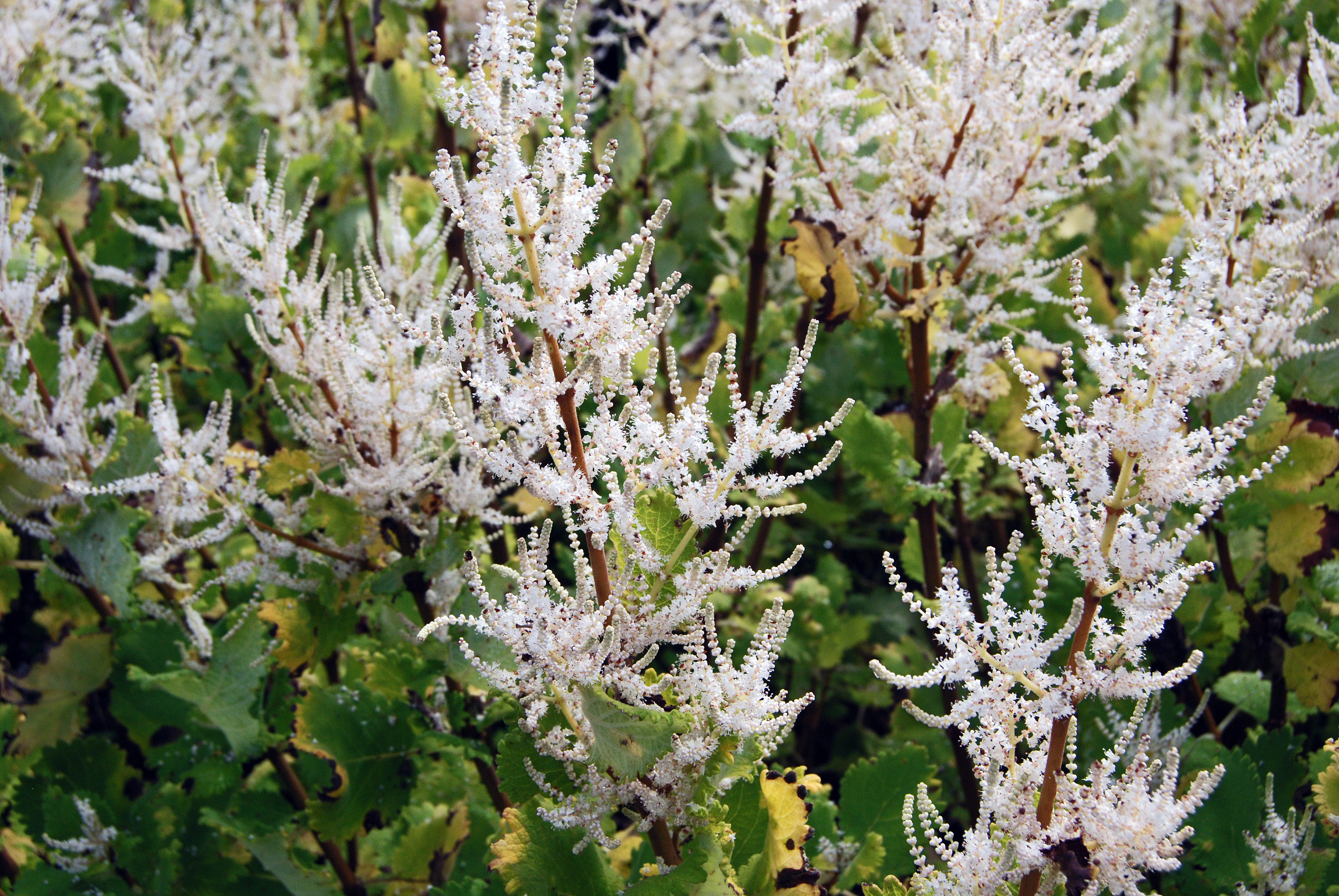
- Leaves and flowers

Conservation status
- Least Concern (IUCN 3.1)

Scientific classification
- Kingdom: Plantae
- Clade: Tracheophytes
- Clade: Angiosperms
- Clade: Eudicots
- Clade: Asterids
- Order: Lamiales
- Family: Lamiaceae
- Genus: Tetradenia
- Species: T. riparia

Binomial name
- Tetradenia riparia (Hochst.) Codd

Synonyms
- Basilicum myriostachyum (Benth.) Kuntze; Basilicum riparium (Hochst.) Kuntze; Gumira ferruginea (A.Rich.) Kuntze; Iboza riparia (Hochst.) N.E.Br.; Moschosma myriostachyum Benth.; Moschosma riparium Hochst.; Plectranthus riparius Hochst.; Premna ferruginea A.Rich.

= Tetradenia riparia =

Species of flowering plant in the mint family

Tetradenia riparia is a species of flowering plant native to southern Africa. It belongs in the mint and sage family Lamiaceae. Common names include ginger bush, incense bush, Ibozane, and musk bush. It is occasionally referred to as misty plume bush and is commonly used as a decorative garden plant due to its flowers when in full bloom.

Tetradenia means 'four glands' and riparia translates to 'growing on banks of rivers'.

== Description ==
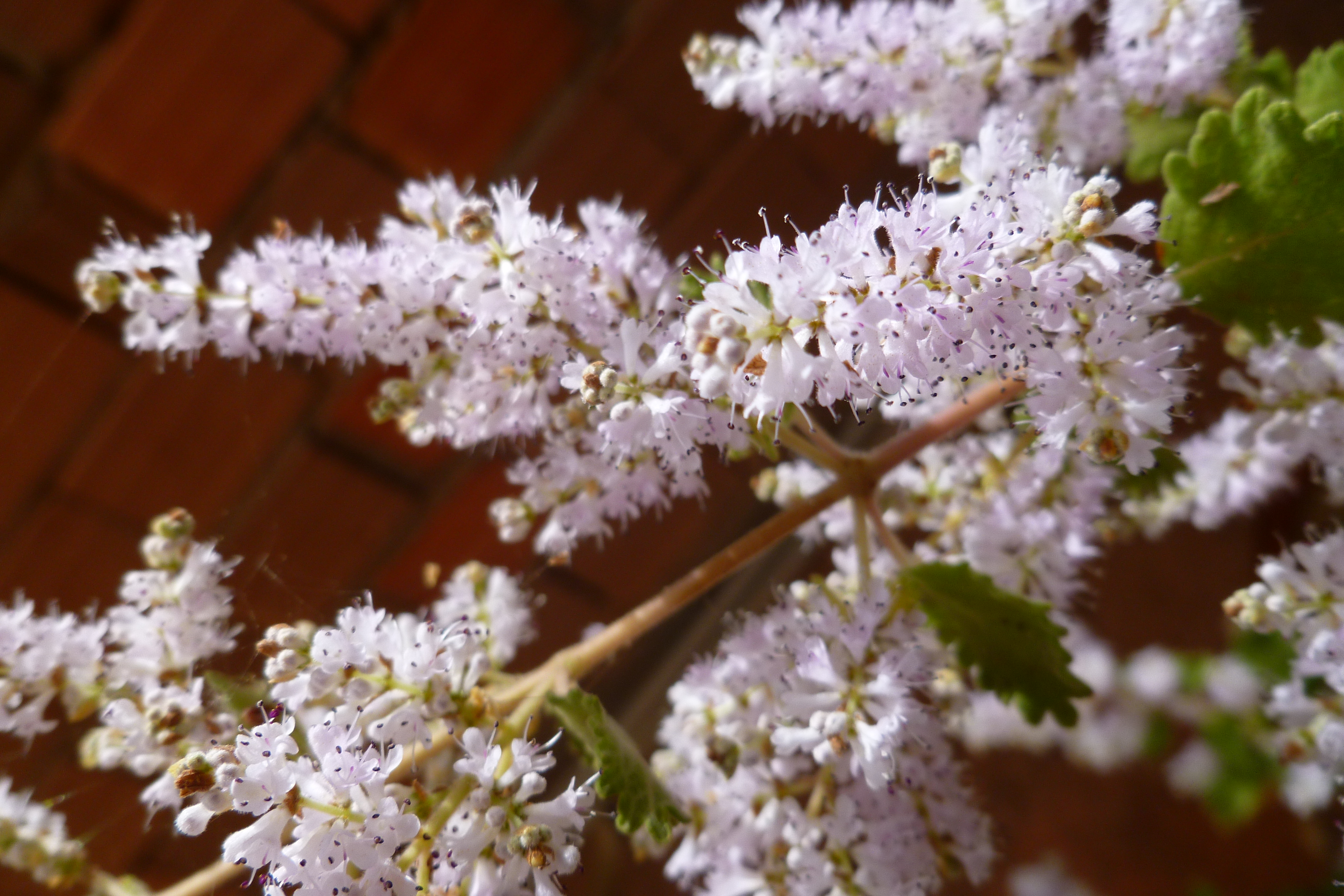
Inflorescence

It is a dioecious, slightly succulent shrub that grows up to 2 m (6 ft 7 in) high, occasionally reaching 5 m (16 ft), with irregular branch pattern. The leaves are simple, opposite, bright green, somewhat heart-shaped, sticky, aromatic, with the margin irregularly, coarsely toothed, and are 35–80 mm (1.4–3.1 in) long. Leaves that are crushed have a ginger scent and both sides are covered with a thin dark red lint.

The stems are brown, smooth, though younger stems feature glandular hairs and a ruby tinge, making them somewhat sticky to touch. The plant is deciduous and multi-stemmed while the branches are semi-succulent.

=== Inflorescences ===
The inflorescences are branched, large bunches at the ends of the shoots. About three millimeters in diameter and would appear in veins, the flowers range in color from white to lilac, and pink flowers are also found. Male flower spikes have more of the "mist" effect than the female flowers which tend to be more compact. Flowering occurs only in subtropical or temperate climates in wintertime (June–August in Africa) when the plant is bare, in the top section of the branches (coinciding with the frost in the Highveld gardens).

== Range ==
It grows on the banks of rivers and hillsides, including riverbanks, forest edges, dry woodland valleys and hillsides where there is only minor frost. It is found in eastern South Africa in the provinces of KwaZulu-Natal, Mpumalanga and Limpopo, Namibia, Angola and Botswana and in eastern tropical Africa into Ethiopia.

== Cultivation ==
It is commonly planted in gardens as an ornamental because of its abundant decorative flowering. Fast growing (up to 80 cm per year), the plant will flower in its first year and would prefer occasional watering in summer, though less so in winter. It prefers well drained and well composted soil, and it needs pruning after flowering. It is easily propagated by cuttings.

=== Medicinal ===
This shrub is considered a medicinal plant. The essential oil of its leaves feature antimalarial contents. It is one of Rwanda's most popular herbal remedies and has been used throughout its range to treat cough, malaria, diarrhea, dengue fever, headaches (inhaling the leaves scent), toothache and some other ailments.

The herb used is fresh or dried leaves and young shoots. Herbs are usually collected as needed, as they tend to black out and dry poorly. Laboratory studies have shown that the herb contains ingredients that actually moderate the malaria-causing Plasmodium falciparum parasite. An extract from the leaves has been found to inhibit bacterial growth.

== Gallery ==
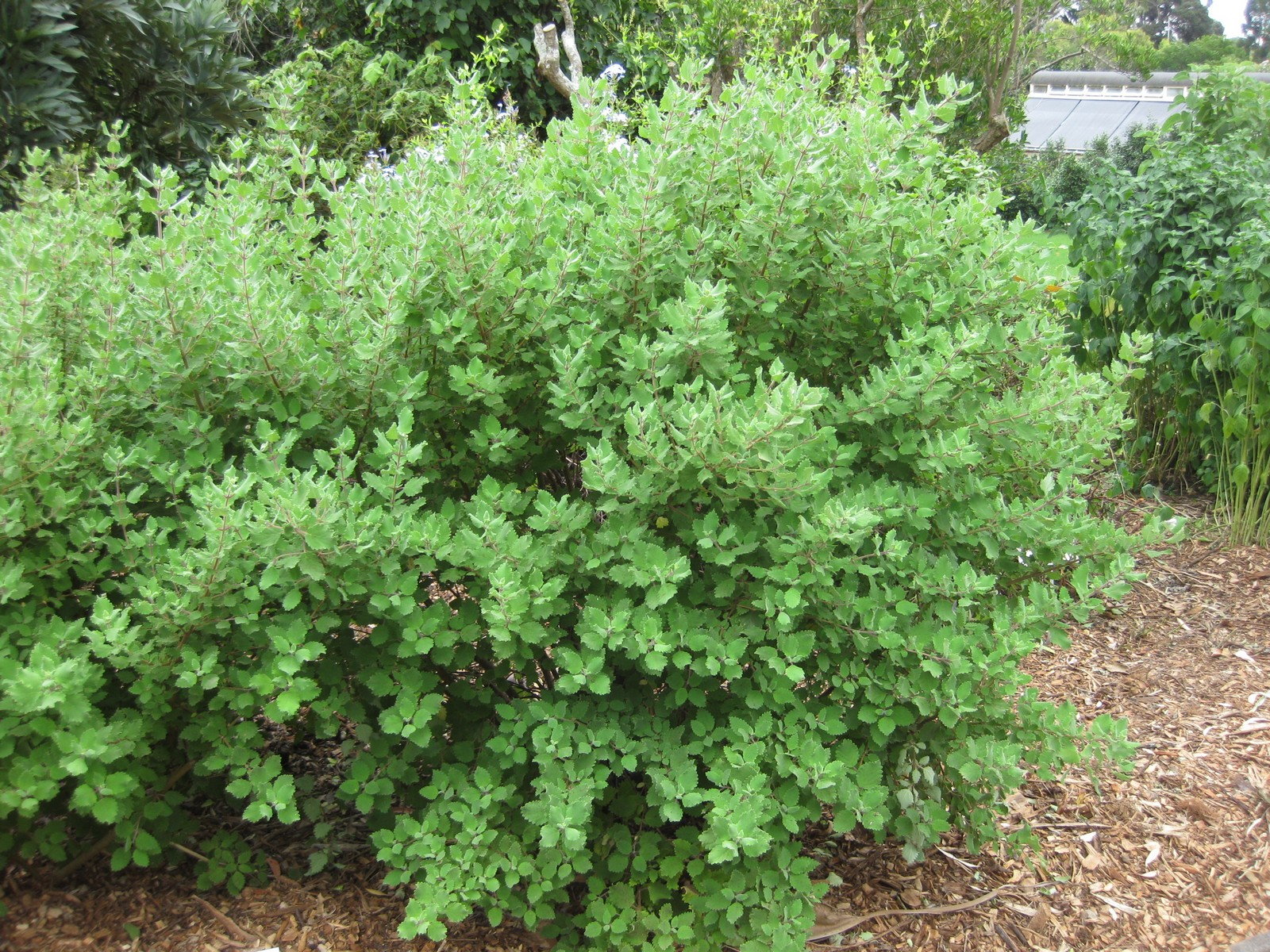
New foliage growth in spring

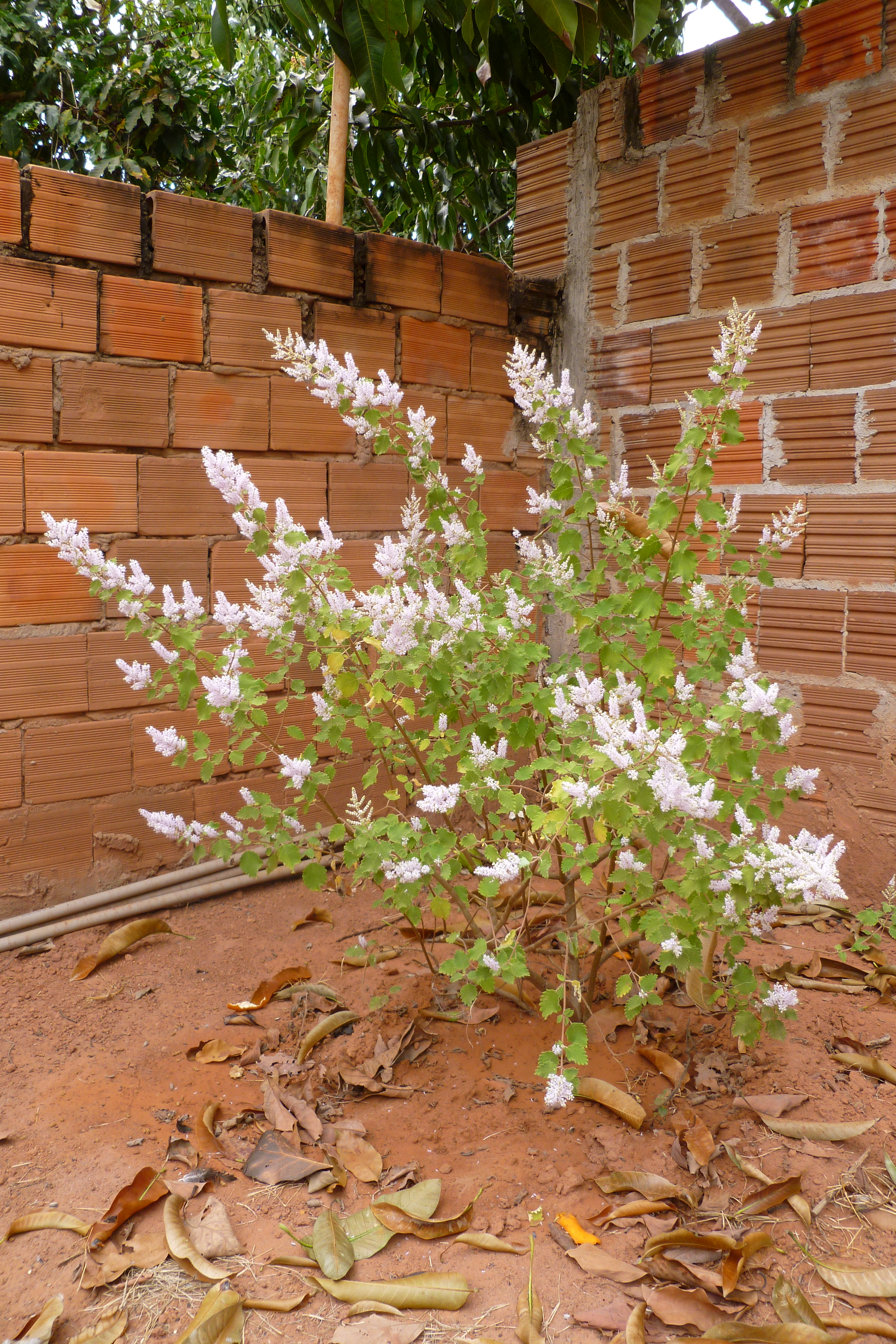
Overview of Tetradenia riparia in cultivation in a garden

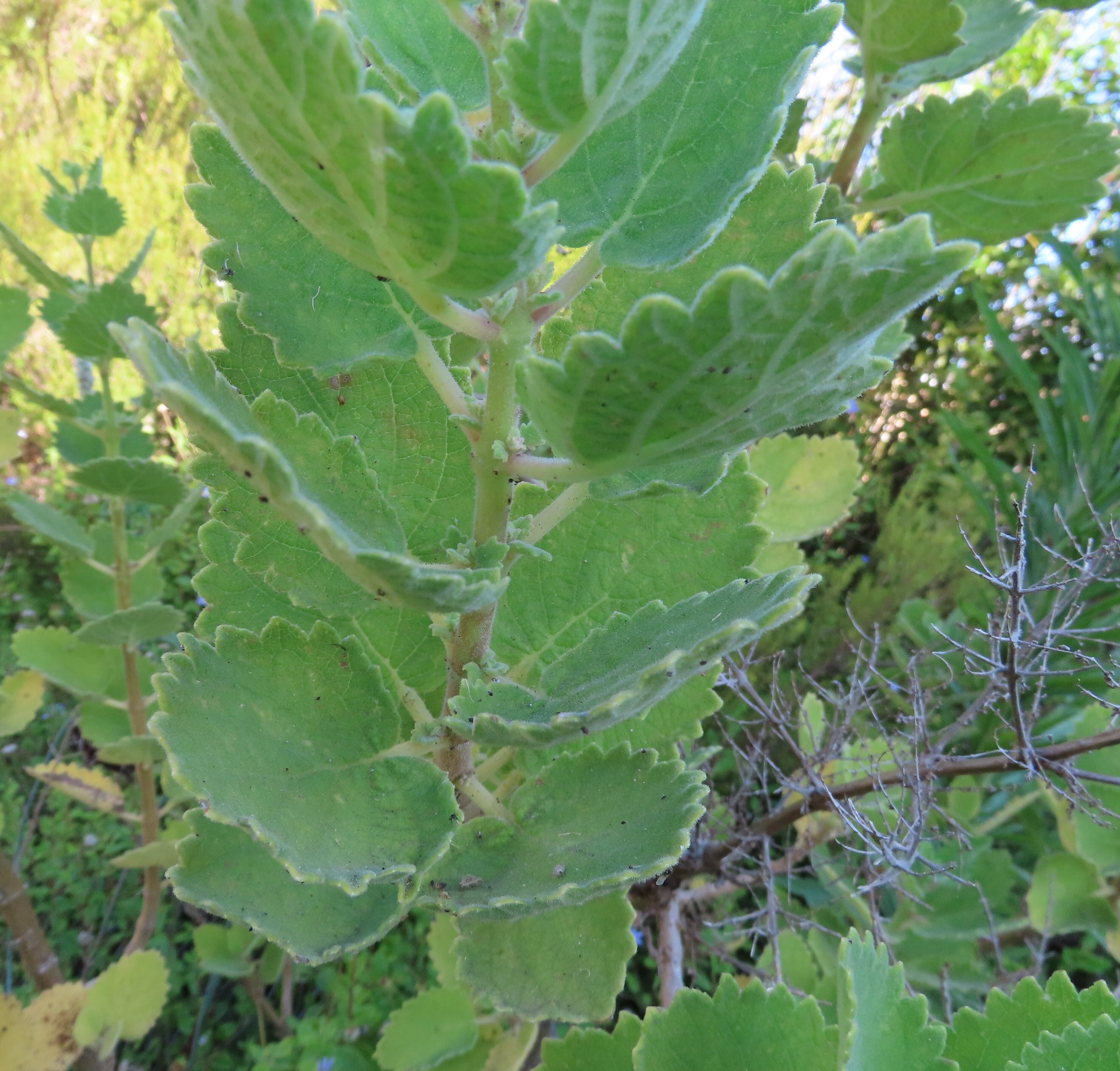
Leaves and buds

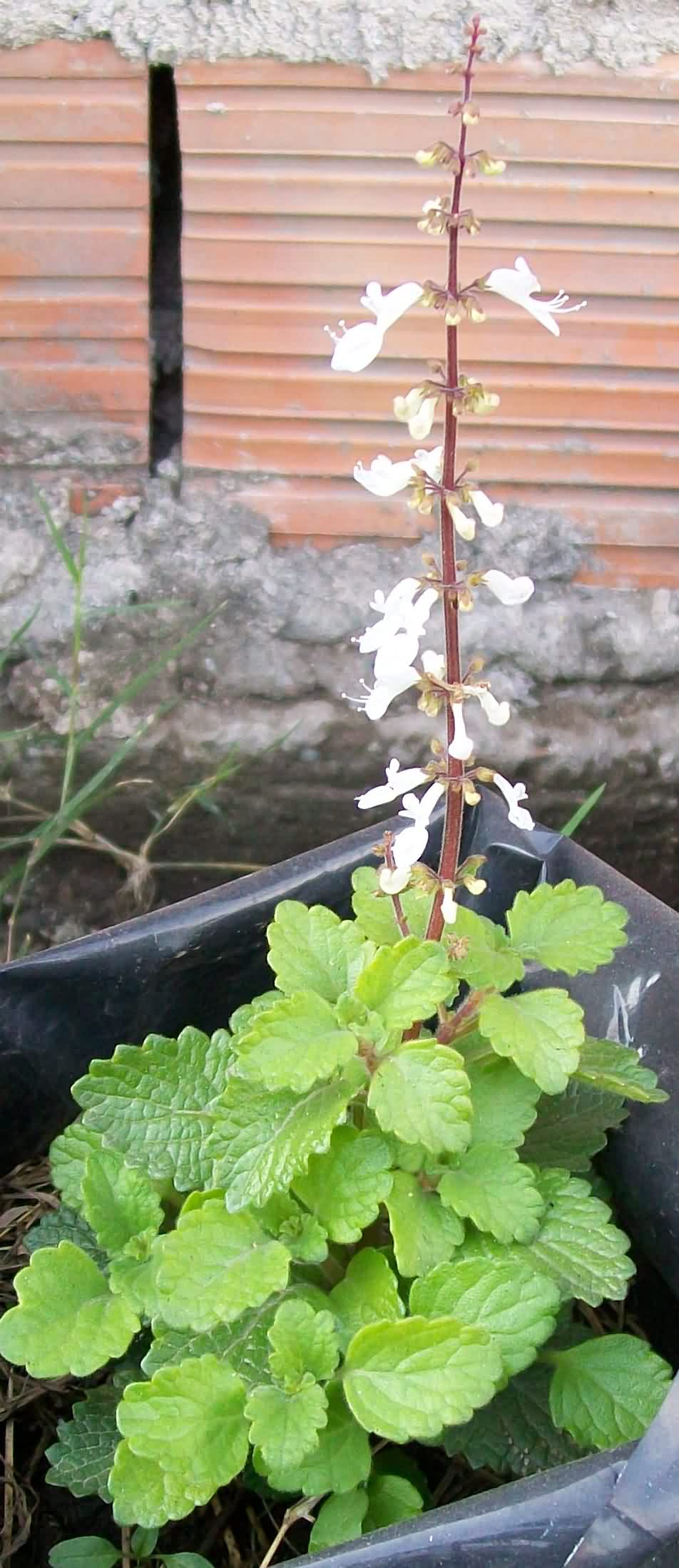
Flowering cuttings of Tetradenia riparia

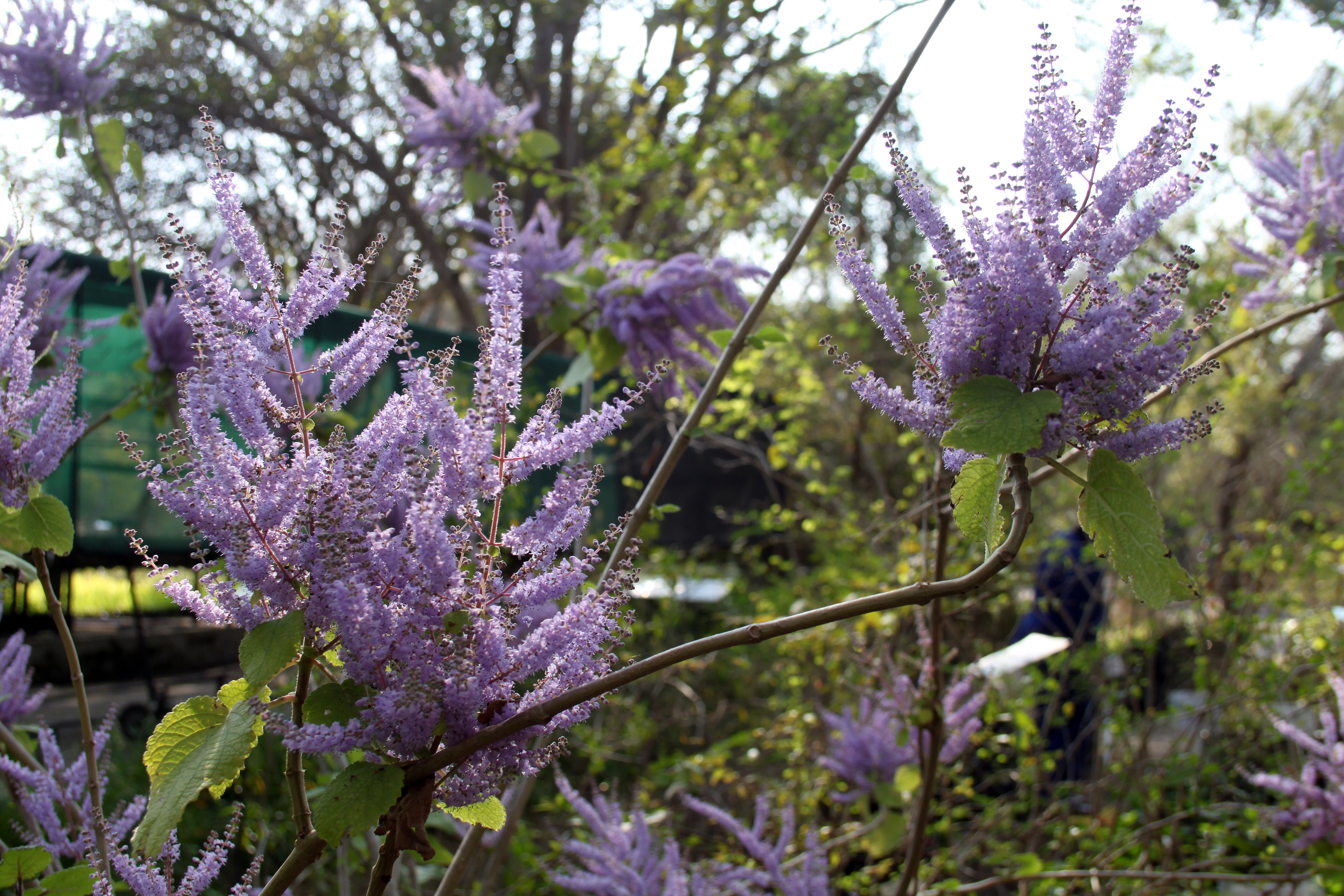
Purple-flowering variety

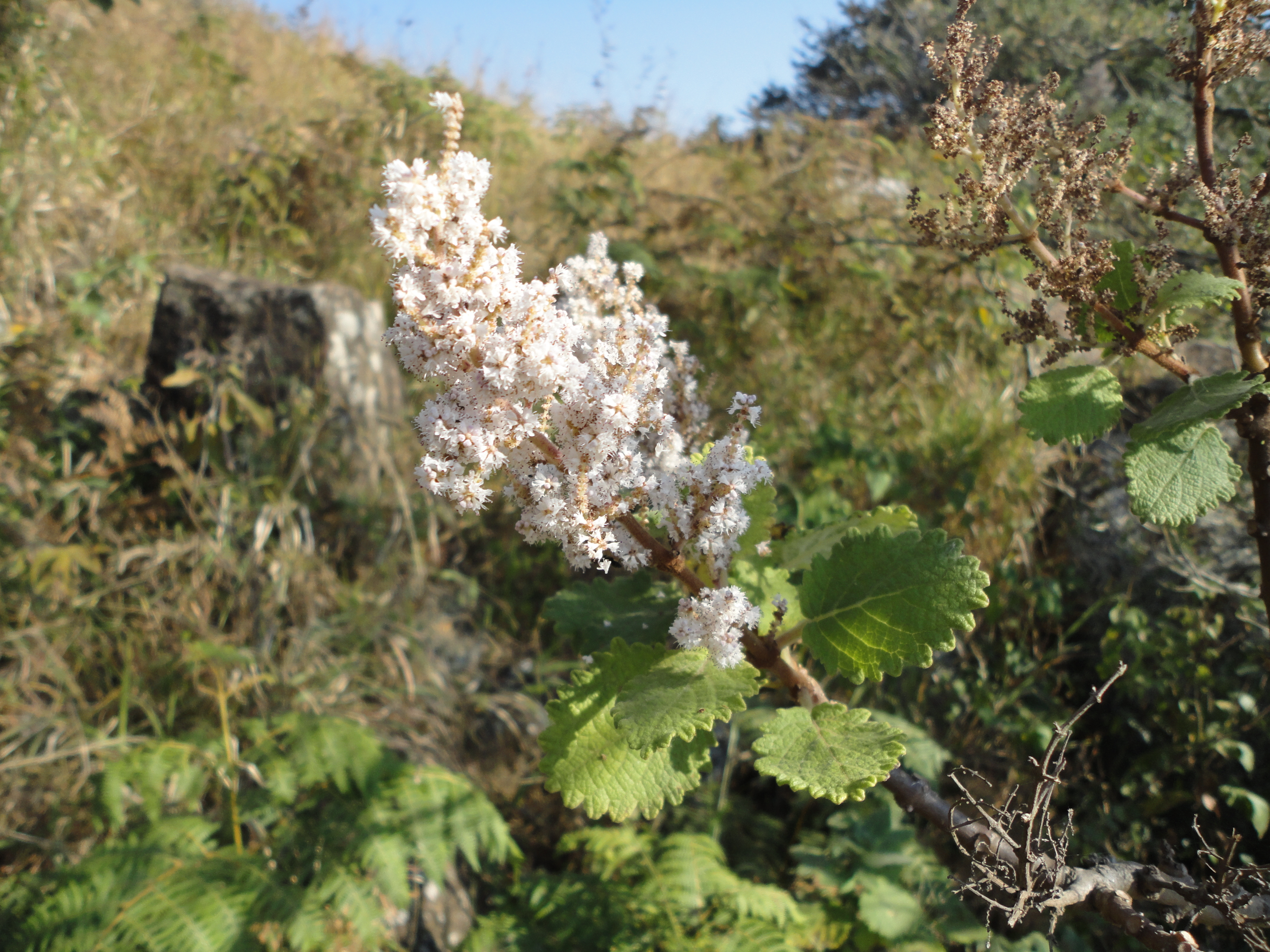
Tetradenia riparia in its natural habitat in Louwsburg (KwaZulu-Natal)

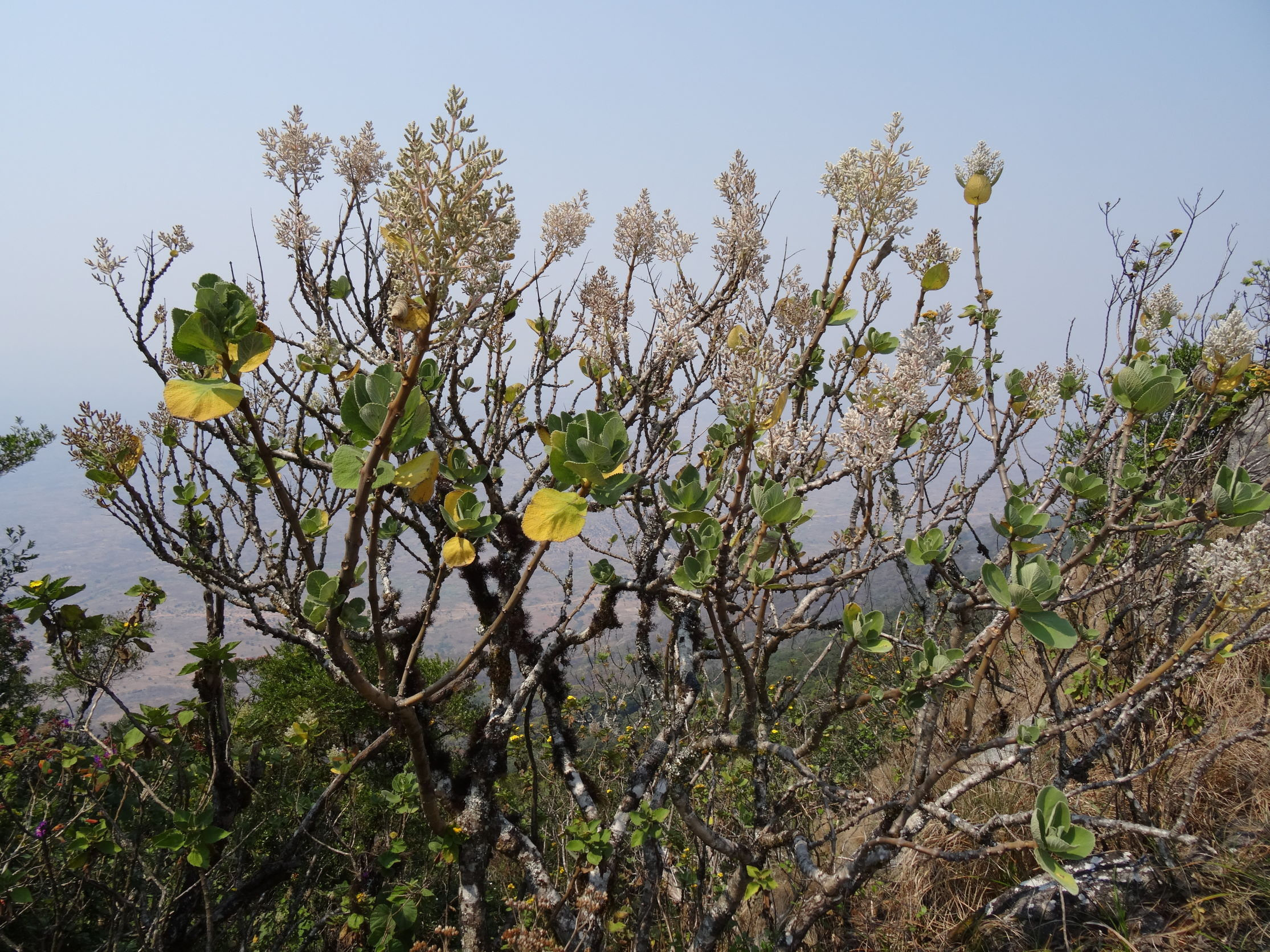
Tetradenia riparia in situ at 1600 m altitude (near Ribáuè in the north of Mozambique)

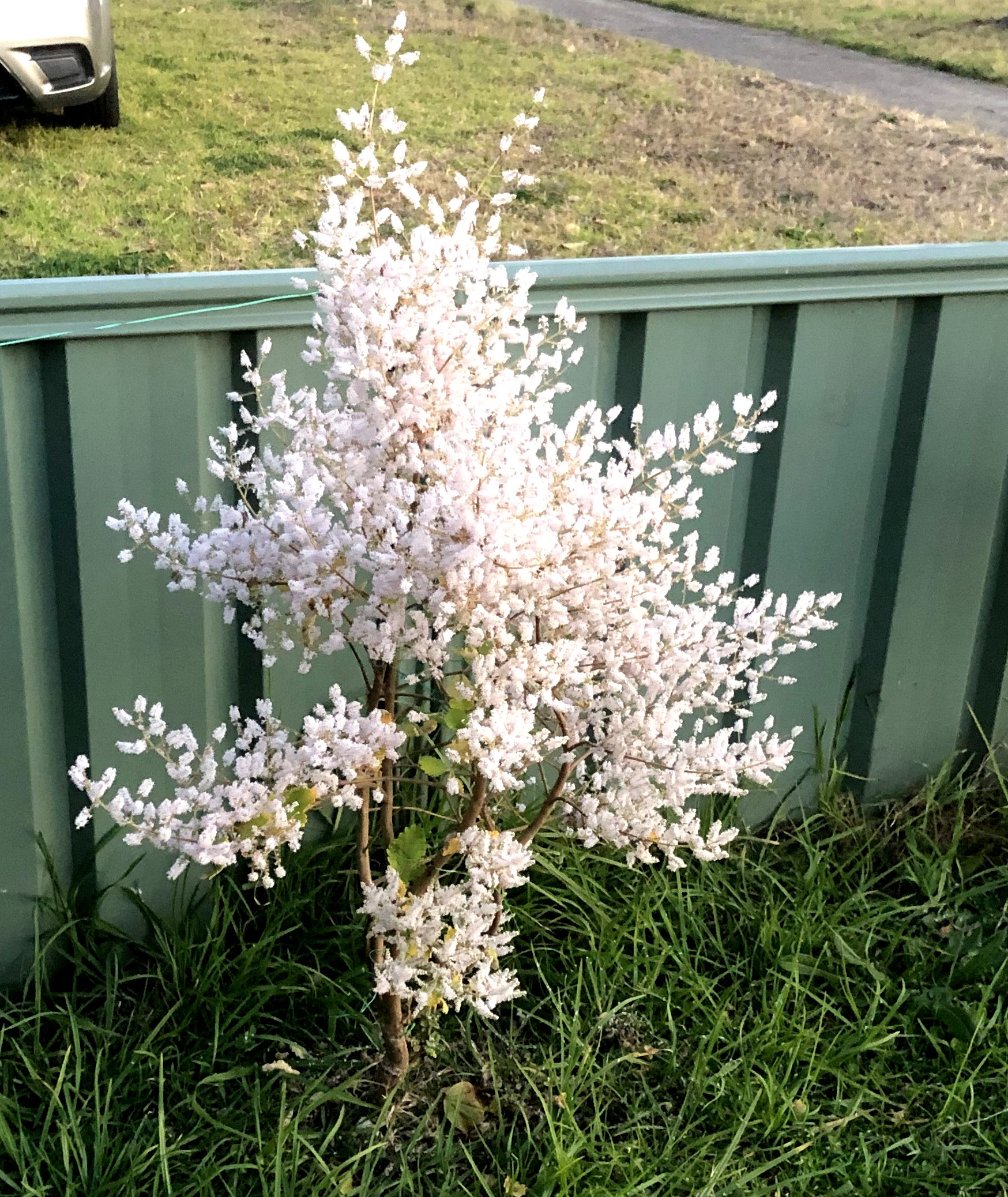
The plant in full bloom in Sydney, Australia
