= Thorncroftia thorncroftii =

Conservation status
- Vulnerable (SANBI Red List)

Scientific classification
- Kingdom: Plantae
- Clade: Tracheophytes
- Clade: Angiosperms
- Clade: Eudicots
- Clade: Asterids
- Order: Lamiales
- Family: Lamiaceae
- Genus: Thorncroftia
- Species: T. thorncroftii

Binomial name
- Thorncroftia thorncroftii (S.Moore) Codd

Synonyms
- Plectranthus thorncroftii S.Moore

Species of flowering plant

Thorncroftia thorncroftii, the Barberton whistlesweet, is a flowering plant in the mint family, Lamiaceae. It is found among quartzite boulders in montane grassland at elevations of 900–1,600 m (3,000–5,200 ft), from Barberton in South Africa's Mpumalanga province to Piggs Peak in Eswatini.

The species′ relatively diminutive stature and smaller flowers distinguishes it from other members of the genus, and can, in fact, result in its being confused with species of Coleus and Plectranthus.

== Description ==
Thorncroftia thorncroftii is a small succulent herb to low suffrutex, usually 10–40 cm (4–16 in) tall, occasionally reaching 60 cm (24 in). The stems are erect, sparingly branched, tapering from about 8 mm (0.31 in) in diameter at the base to 4 mm (0.16 in) above, and are covered in short glandular hairs mixed with fine non-glandular hairs.

Leaves are opposite or occasionally whorled, oblong-elliptic to obovate, measuring 15–18 mm (0.59–0.71 in) long and 5–9 mm (0.20–0.35 in) wide. They are dark green above and paler below, often with a purple margin, and softly hairy on both surfaces. The midvein is slightly channelled near the base, with veins otherwise level above and weakly raised beneath. The apex is rounded to blunt, and the margins are sparsely crenate-dentate, with about three teeth on each side in the upper part of the leaf. Petioles are 4.5–7 mm (0.18–0.28 in) long.

The inflorescence is a sparse terminal raceme, sometimes with one or two short lateral branches near the base, up to about 8 cm (3.1 in) long. Bracts are leaf-like, green with purple margins, and decrease in size towards the tip. The flower stalks are 3–7 mm (0.12–0.28 in) long and typically maroon to purple. The calyx is 4–7 mm (0.16–0.28 in) long, green and becoming flushed purple with age, and densely hairy, particularly along the veins and margins. The calyx teeth are unequal, with the longest 2–3 mm (0.08–0.12 in) long.

The corolla is white, with purple spotting on the upper lobe. The tube is short and saccate, 4–8 mm (0.16–0.31 in) long. The upper lobes are erect and strongly folded back, the lateral lobes spreading and often obliquely elliptic, and the lower lobe boat-shaped, initially projecting forward before turning downward. Stamens have white filaments 5–7 mm (0.20–0.28 in) long, dark purple anthers, and greenish-yellow pollen. The style is 5–7 mm (0.20–0.28 in) long, extending beyond the stamens after they have recoiled, white at the base and lilac towards the tip, with short purple style branches.

T. thorncroftii flowers from February to May, peaking in March. Flowers have a pleasantly sweet smell.

== Etymology ==
The genus Thorncroftia and this species are named for George Thorncroft (1857‒1934), an amateur botanist who collected extensively in the Barberton area.

== See also ==
- List of Lamiaceae of South Africa
