= Aeollanthus saxatilis =

Conservation status
- Near Threatened (IUCN 3.1)

Scientific classification
- Kingdom: Plantae
- Clade: Tracheophytes
- Clade: Angiosperms
- Clade: Eudicots
- Clade: Asterids
- Order: Lamiales
- Family: Lamiaceae
- Genus: Aeollanthus
- Species: A. saxatilis

Binomial name
- Aeollanthus saxatilis P.A. Duvign. & Denaeyer

Species of flowering plant

Aeollanthus saxatilis, the Katangan rocksage, is a species of plant in the mint family, Lamiaceae. It is endemic to the Katangan Copperbelt in Katanga Province, Democratic Republic of the Congo. It is an absolute metallophyte, living on rocky steppes with copper-rich soils. It is threatened by surface mining activities.
