= Equilabium laxiflorum =

Scientific classification
- Kingdom: Plantae
- Clade: Tracheophytes
- Clade: Angiosperms
- Clade: Eudicots
- Clade: Asterids
- Order: Lamiales
- Family: Lamiaceae
- Genus: Equilabium
- Species: E. laxiflorum

Binomial name
- Equilabium laxiflorum (Benth.) Mwany., A.J.Paton & Culham

Synonyms
- Germanea laxiflora (Benth.) Hiern; Plectranthus albus Gürke; Plectranthus kondowensis Baker; Plectranthus laxiflorus Benth.; Plectranthus lilacinus Gürke; Plectranthus violaceus Gürke

Species of flowering plant

Equilabium laxiflorum, commonly called the citronella slippermint or citronella spurflower, is a species of flowering plant in the family Lamiaceae. It is found from Ethiopia in the north to South Africa in the south.

== Description ==
This is an aromatic perennial herb with climbing or scrambling stems reaching up to 4 m (13 ft). Stems are ascending to erect, square in cross-section, often swollen below the nodes, branching above and becoming woody and rooting below; pubescent to villose with retrorse hairs, and bearing glandular hairs and red sessile glands on the inflorescence.

Leaves are petiolate; blades are heart-shaped to triangular, 3–10 cm (1.2–3.9 in) long (occasionally to 15 cm (5.9 in)), crenate to irregularly toothed, sometimes weakly revolute, with a pointed to apiculate tip and a heart-shaped to squared-off base. Surfaces are pubescent to tomentose beneath with red sessile glands.

The inflorescences are terminal, lax, with spaced verticils of six or more flowers. Bracts are ovate and much smaller than the leaves.

Flowers are borne on stalks 3–6 mm (0.12–0.24 in) long. The calyx is small, pubescent, and glandular, enlarging slightly in fruit. Its lobes are lanceolate, the posterior lobe being slightly broader and longer than those of the anterior lip.

The corolla is white to pale mauve, occasionally blue-tinged, 10–18 mm (0.39–0.71 in) long, with a sigmoid tube and a horizontal to ascending, hooded anterior lip enclosing the stamens.

When its leaves are crushed, Equilabium laxiflorum emits a powerful lemon scent.

== Distribution and habitat ==
Equilabium laxiflorum grows in damp conditions in forest margins and clearings in the eastern DRC, Eswatini, Ethiopia, Kenya, Malawi, Mozambique, Rwanda, Tanzania, Uganda, Zambia, Zimbabwe, and South Africa.

In the latter country, it can be found from Limpopo through Mpumalanga and the KwaZulu-Natal midlands to the Wild Coast in the Eastern Cape and along the coast to Humansdorp.

== See also ==
- List of Lamiaceae of South Africa
