= Capitanopsis oreophila =

Conservation status
- Vulnerable (IUCN 3.1)

Scientific classification
- Kingdom: Plantae
- Clade: Tracheophytes
- Clade: Angiosperms
- Clade: Eudicots
- Clade: Asterids
- Order: Lamiales
- Family: Lamiaceae
- Genus: Capitanopsis
- Species: C. oreophila

Binomial name
- Capitanopsis oreophila (Hedge) Mwany., A.J.Paton & Culham

Synonyms
- Perrierastrum oreophilum Guillaumin; Plectranthus bipinnatus A.J.Paton

Species of flowering plant

Capitanopsis oreophila, synonym Plectranthus bipinnatus, is a species of flowering plant in the family Lamiaceae. It is a small shrub native to Madagascar, where it is commonly known as andriamborondrao.

== Range and habitat ==
Capitanopsis oreophila is native to southeastern Madagascar. It is found on humid, subhumid, and high-elevation rock faces and inselbergs between 500 and 2,500 meters elevation.

== Taxonomy ==
The species was first described in 1930 by André Guillaumin, as Perrierastrum oreophilum, the only species in his genus Perrierastrum. In 2003, Alan James Paton decided that the genus should be sunk into Plectranthus. As the name Plectranthus oreophilus had already been used (in 1912), Paton coined the replacement name Plectranthus bipinnatus. A major phylogenetic study of the subtribe Plectranthinae in 2018 showed that Plectranthus bipinnatus was embedded in a clade containing the then three species of Capitanopsis, so P. bipinnatus was transferred to Capitanopsis under the original epithet.
