= Thorncroftia lotteri =

Conservation status
- Vulnerable (SANBI Red List)

Scientific classification
- Kingdom: Plantae
- Clade: Tracheophytes
- Clade: Angiosperms
- Clade: Eudicots
- Clade: Asterids
- Order: Lamiales
- Family: Lamiaceae
- Genus: Thorncroftia
- Species: T. lotteri

Binomial name
- Thorncroftia lotteri T.J.Edwards & McMurtry

Species of flowering plant

Thorncroftia lotteri is a species of Thorncroftia commonly known as the Ugutugulu whistlesweet. It is endemic to South Africa′s Mpumalanga province, where it grows at 1,000–1,400 m (3,300–4,600 ft) above sea level on rocky mountain tops and quartzite ridges in the Barberton area.

Range-restricted and threatened by forestry operations and informal mining, it is listed as Vulnerable by SANBI.

== Description ==
Thorncroftia lotteri is a semi-succulent, erect herb or small shrub growing 30–100 cm (12–39 in) tall, usually with several main stems. The stems are grey near the base and purple to pale green above, sparingly branched, and densely covered in a felt-like layer of recurved hairs with scattered capitate glands.

The leaves are opposite, ovate to elliptic-obovate, typically 3–4 cm (1.2–1.6 in) long and 2–3 cm (0.8–1.2 in) wide. The venation is sunken above and prominently raised below, forming a network of shallow recesses. Both leaf surfaces are hairy, especially the underside. The leaf margins are crenate in the upper three-quarters, with nine or more rounded scallops on each side. The leaf tip is rounded or acute, the base cuneate to obtuse, and the petiole is relatively long, usually 12–15 mm (0.47–0.59 in).

The inflorescence is a compact, terminal panicle with a main axis up to 20 cm (8 in) long. The bracts are leaf-like near the base of the inflorescence and become progressively smaller towards the tip.

The calyx is two-lipped and five-toothed, purple to maroon in colour, and 7–9 mm (0.28–0.35 in) long in fruit. The corolla is tubular, narrowly cylindrical, and laterally compressed, measuring about 20–23 mm (0.79–0.91 in) in length. It is light lilac, becoming paler towards the tip, and bears conspicuous glandular hairs. The upper lobes are erect and often folded back at the edges, marked with purple streaks or blotches. The lateral lobes project forward, while the lower lobe initially projects before becoming fully reflexed.

The stamens are 5–7 mm (0.20–0.28 in) long, with dark purple anthers and yellow to orange pollen. The style is light lilac with a purple tip and extends beyond the corolla once the stamens have recoiled.

T. lotteri flowers in March and April, and very occasionally in January.

It bears a close resemblance to both T. succulenta and T. coddii. One way to distinguish it from them is by looking at the leaf margin. In T. lotteri, each side of the leaf has nine to 12 rounded teeth that are fairly evenly spaced, while the other species are less regular in this regard and tend to have fewer than nine teeth on either side.

== Etymology ==
The genus Thorncroftia is named for George Thorncroft (1857‒1934), an amateur botanist who collected extensively in the Barberton area.

The species is named for Dr Mervyn Lötter (b. 1972), a biodiversity planner and GIS expert at the Mpumalanga Tourism and Parks Agency, who helped collect specimens of the plant.

== See also ==
- List of Lamiaceae of South Africa
