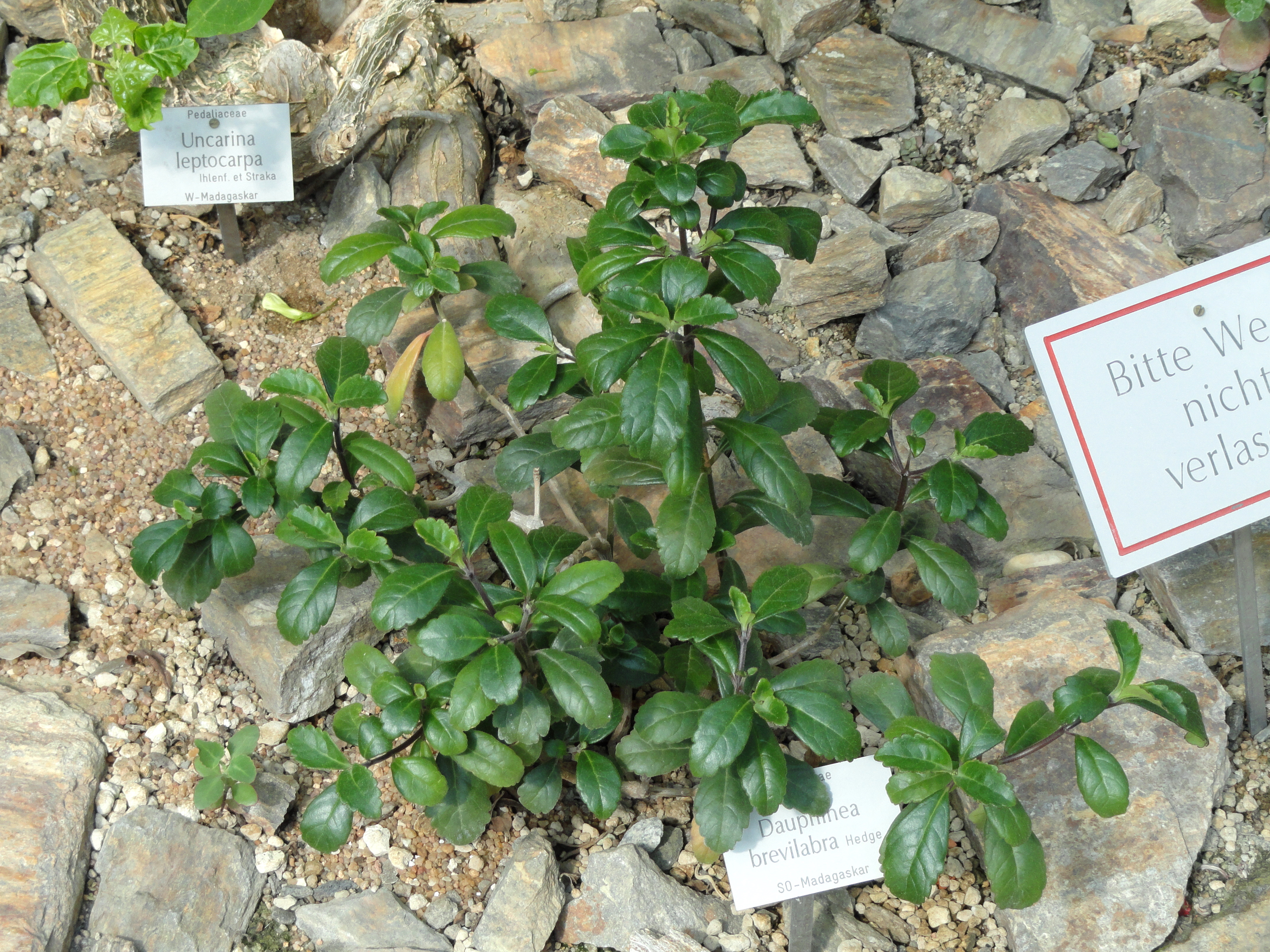

Conservation status
- Endangered (IUCN 3.1)

Scientific classification
- Kingdom: Plantae
- Clade: Tracheophytes
- Clade: Angiosperms
- Clade: Eudicots
- Clade: Asterids
- Order: Lamiales
- Family: Lamiaceae
- Genus: Capitanopsis
- Species: C. brevilabra

Binomial name
- Capitanopsis brevilabra (Hedge) Mwany., A.J.Paton & Culham

Synonyms
- Dauphinea brevilabra Hedge

= Capitanopsis brevilabra =

Species of flowering plant

Capitanopsis brevilabra is a species of flowering plant in the family Lamiaceae. It is an herb or shrub native to southeastern Madagascar. It flowers in March.

== Range and habitat ==
Capitanopsis brevilabra is found only in the Sainte Luce area in southeastern coastal Madagascar, where it grows in humid littoral forests between sea level and 50 meters elevation.

The species has a restricted range, and is threatened with habitat loss from deforestation and mining. A portion of the species' range is in the Ambato Atsinanana protected area. The species' conservation status is assessed as Endangered.

== Taxonomy ==
It was formerly treated as the only species, Dauphinea brevilabra, in the genus Dauphinea. A phylogenetic study in 2018 found that it was embedded in the genus Capitanopsis, and it was transferred to that genus.
