= Capitanopsis magentea =

Conservation status
- Vulnerable (IUCN 3.1)

Scientific classification
- Kingdom: Plantae
- Clade: Tracheophytes
- Clade: Angiosperms
- Clade: Eudicots
- Clade: Asterids
- Order: Lamiales
- Family: Lamiaceae
- Genus: Capitanopsis
- Species: C. magentea

Binomial name
- Capitanopsis magentea (Hedge) Mwany., A.J.Paton & Culham

Synonyms
- Madlabium magenteum Hedge

Species of flowering plant

Capitanopsis magentea is a species of flowering plant in the family Lamiaceae. It is native to northern Madagascar.

== Description ==
Capitanopsis magentea is a large shrub or small tree, which grows to 1.5 to 6 meters high.

== Range and habitat ==
Capitanopsis magentea occurs naturally in northern Diana and Sava regions of Madagascar, at the northern end of the island.

It is found in dry deciduous forests between sea level and 626 meters elevation, where it grows on karstic limestone, lava, basement rock and unconsolidated sand substrates.

The species' area of occupancy (AOO) is estimated to be 48 km^{2}, and the extent of occurrence (EOO) is estimated to be 5,221 km^{2}. It is threatened by habitat loss from conversion to farmland, wood harvesting, and logging.

== Taxonomy ==
It was formerly treated as the only species, Madlabium magenteum, in the genus Madlabium. A phylogenetic study in 2018 found that it was embedded in the genus Capitanopsis, and it was transferred to that genus.
