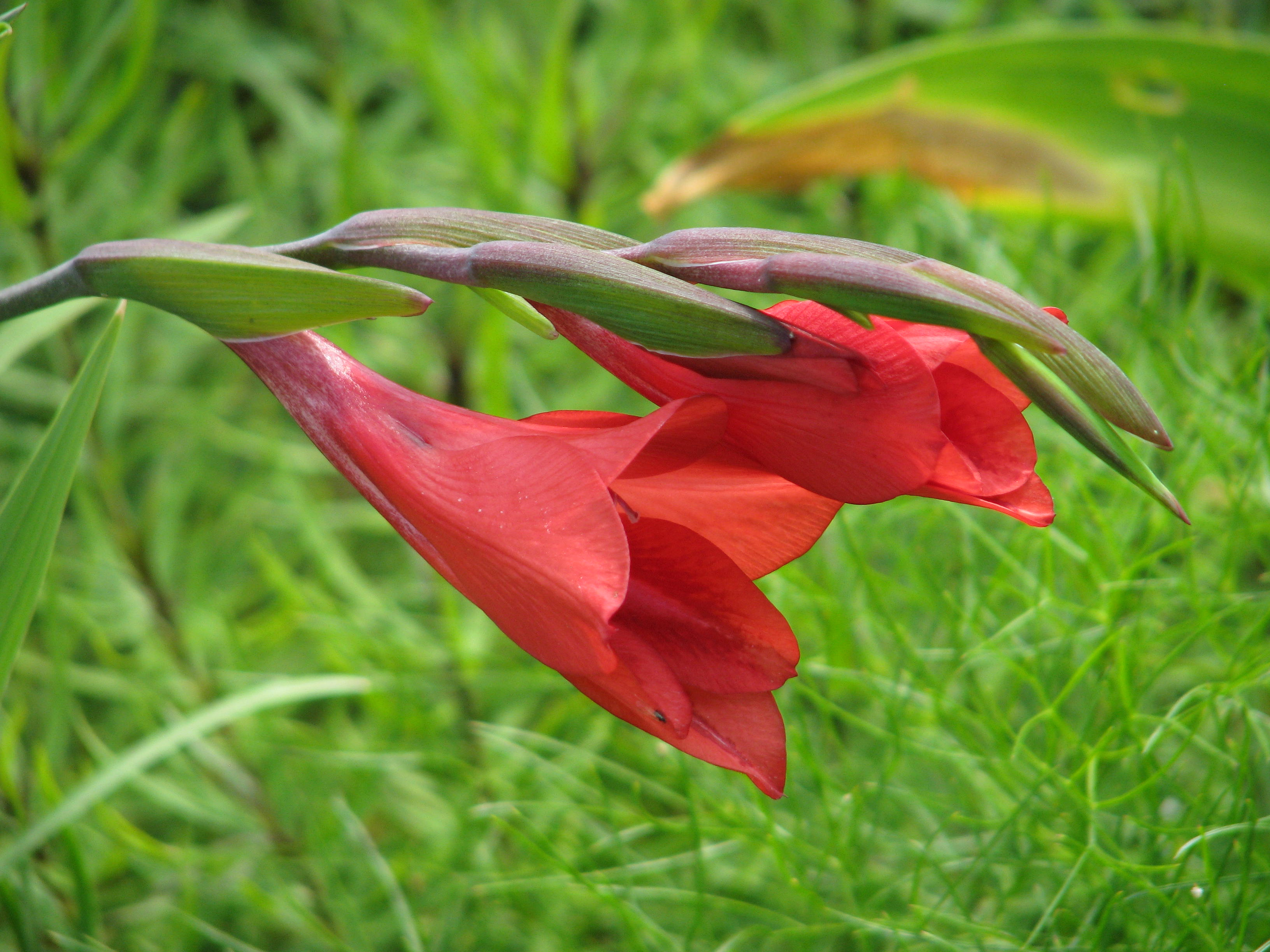

Scientific classification
- Kingdom: Plantae
- Clade: Tracheophytes
- Clade: Angiosperms
- Clade: Monocots
- Order: Asparagales
- Family: Iridaceae
- Genus: Gladiolus
- Species: G. flanaganii

Binomial name
- Gladiolus flanaganii Baker in W.H.Harvey, 1897

= Gladiolus flanaganii =

Species of flowering plant

Gladiolus flanaganii is a Gladiolus species found in cliffs of the Drakensberg in KwaZulu-Natal, South Africa.

This is a flower with a two inch wide, red blooming opening on short spikes. As many as seven flowers can appear on each spike. It is summer blooming and tolerant of summer water before going dormant in late summer.

The species was named flanaganii in commemoration of Henry George Flanagan a botanist from the Eastern Cape.

It is sometimes called “Suicide Lily” due to it growing against cliffs, which can be dangerous for those who attempt to collect it.
