= Aeollanthus parvifolius =

Scientific classification
- Kingdom: Plantae
- Clade: Tracheophytes
- Clade: Angiosperms
- Clade: Eudicots
- Clade: Asterids
- Order: Lamiales
- Family: Lamiaceae
- Genus: Aeollanthus
- Species: A. parvifolius

Binomial name
- Aeollanthus parvifolius Benth.

Species of flowering plant

Aeollanthus parvifolius is a drought-tolerant, succulent, perennial shrublet belonging to the Lamiaceae family, commonly known as rock sage (English) or klipsalie (Afrikaans).

== Description ==
Aeollanthus parvifolius a multi-stemmed, aromatic, fast-growing plant that can reach up to 0.8 meters in height, with succulent, spreading opposite leaves that are egg-shaped to rounded, measuring 15–55 mm in length and 8–25 mm in width, and featuring 2 to 3 pairs of shallow teeth along the margin. Flowers appear from late summer to autumn, are two-lipped and tubular, measuring up to 12 mm in length, and range in color from white to light pink, often with mauve or reddish-purple markings on the upper lip. The flowers are borne on lax panicles or much-branched inflorescences, with stalks reaching up to 200 mm in length. The fruit consists of small nutlets (usually four per calyx), which remain enclosed in a persistent, enlarging calyx that breaks cleanly at maturity to release the seeds.

Aeollanthus parvifolius is easily propagated from soft tip cuttings, which root rapidly in sand within 1 to 3 weeks, or from older herbaceous material that takes 2 to 4 weeks.

== Distribution ==
This species is native to southern Africa, with a wide distribution from the northern Eastern Cape through Mpumalanga and Limpopo provinces, extending into Swaziland and southern Mozambique. It typically grows in montane and cliff-dwelling habitats, including grassland, savanna, and Afro-temperate vegetation, often found in rock crevices with varying aspects.

== See also ==
- List of Lamiaceae of South Africa
