= Thorncroftia succulenta =

Conservation status
- Least Concern (SANBI Red List)

Scientific classification
- Kingdom: Plantae
- Clade: Tracheophytes
- Clade: Angiosperms
- Clade: Eudicots
- Clade: Asterids
- Order: Lamiales
- Family: Lamiaceae
- Genus: Thorncroftia
- Species: T. succulenta

Binomial name
- Thorncroftia succulenta (R.A.Dyer & E.A.Bruce) Codd

Synonyms
- Plectranthus succulentus R.A.Dyer & E.A.Bruce

Species of flowering plant

Thorncroftia succulenta is a species of Thorncroftia commonly known as the Soutpansberg whistlesweet. It is endemic to South Africa′s Limpopo province, with localities spanning much of the Soutpansberg mountains. Some materials give a considerably larger distribution, reaching as far south as Barberton in Mpumalanga, but this is because two other members of the genus, T. lotteri and T. coddii, were previously included in T. succulenta.

== Description ==
Thorncroftia succulenta is a succulent-stemmed shrub growing 60–120 cm (24–47 in) tall, with several ascending stems arising from a thickened rootstock. The stems are sparingly branched and densely hairy, with a mixture of glandular hairs and coarse, branched, non-glandular hairs.

The leaves are opposite and variable in shape, ranging from ovate to elliptic, obovate, or almost circular. They typically measure 2–4 cm (0.8–1.6 in) long and 15–36 mm (0.6–1.4 in) wide. The upper leaf surface shows a shallowly sunken midrib near the base, while the midrib and secondary veins are strongly raised below. Both surfaces are densely hairy. The margins are crenate in the upper two-thirds of the leaf, with six to eight rounded scallops on each side. The base is broadly wedge-shaped, and the petiole is relatively long, usually 14–18 mm (0.55–0.71 in).

The inflorescence is a dense, terminal panicle, with additional short racemes sometimes produced at the tips of upper side branches. The main axis may reach up to 18 cm (7.1 in) in length. Bracts are leaf-like near the base of the inflorescence and become progressively smaller towards the tip.

The calyx is 5–7 mm (0.20–0.28 in) long at flowering and densely covered in glandular and coarse non-glandular hairs. The corolla is tubular and narrowly cylindrical, slightly widening towards the tip, and laterally compressed. It is lilac to light mauve in colour and measures about 15–20 mm (0.6–0.8 in) in length. The upper corolla lobes are erect and deeply notched, the lateral lobes hang downward, and the lower lobe is boat-shaped and becomes fully reflexed as the flower opens.

The stamens are 5–7 mm (0.20–0.28 in) long, with dark purple anthers and yellow pollen. The style projects straight out once the stamens have recoiled and is lilac with mauve branches.

T. succulenta flowers in January to July, peaking in April.

== See also ==
- List of Lamiaceae of South Africa
