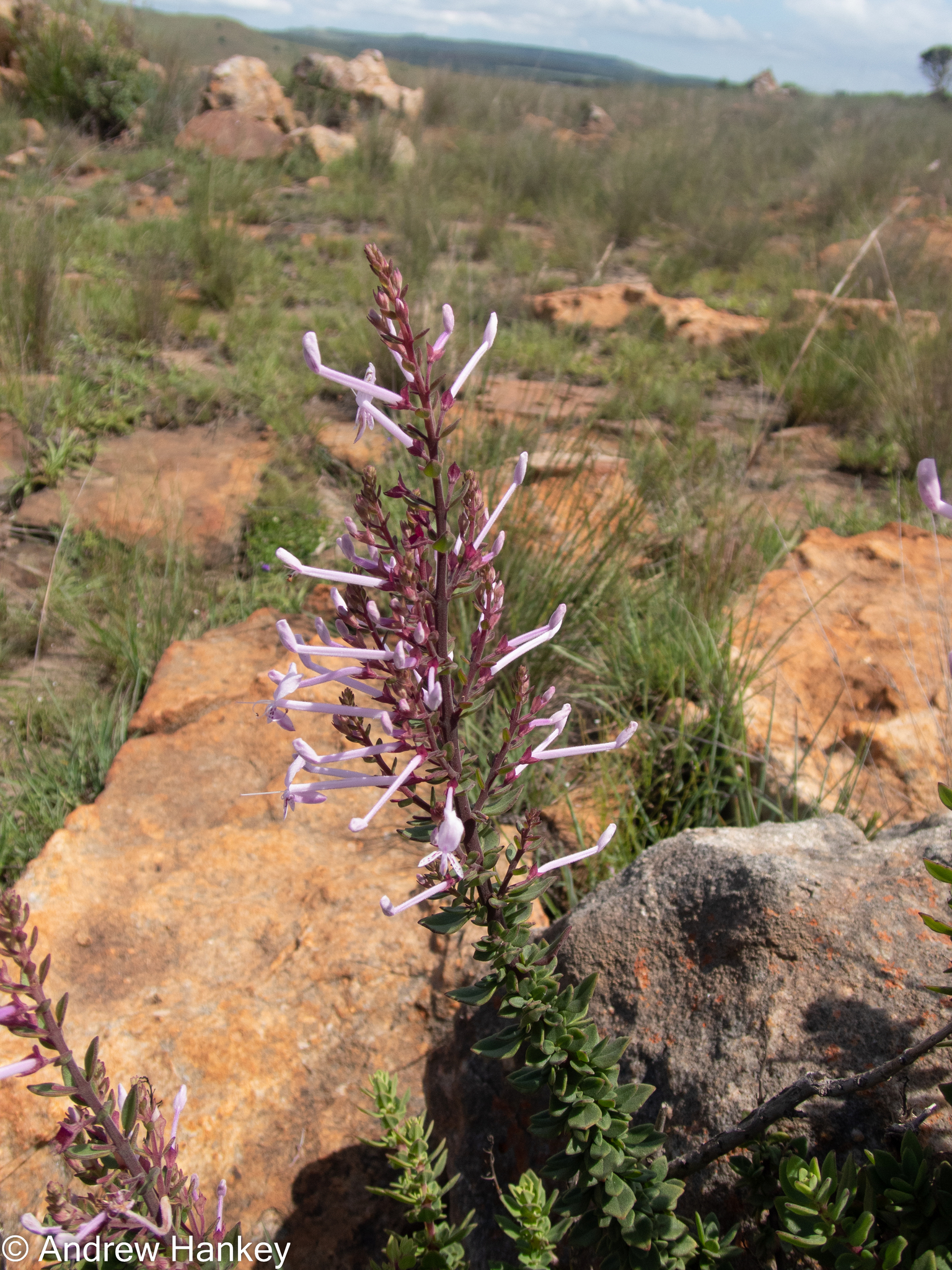

Conservation status
- Endangered (SANBI Red List)

Scientific classification
- Kingdom: Plantae
- Clade: Tracheophytes
- Clade: Angiosperms
- Clade: Eudicots
- Clade: Asterids
- Order: Lamiales
- Family: Lamiaceae
- Genus: Thorncroftia
- Species: T. greenii

Binomial name
- Thorncroftia greenii Changwe & K.Balkwill

= Thorncroftia greenii =

Species of shrub

Thorncroftia greenii, the Pongola whistlesweet, is a species of Thorncroftia, a flowering plant in the mint family, Lamiaceae. It is endemic to northern KwaZulu-Natal in South Africa, where it grows on quartzite outcrops at 700–1,150 m (2,300–3,770 ft) in altitude in the Louwsburg area and towards Pongola.

It is listed as endangered by SANBI.

== Description ==
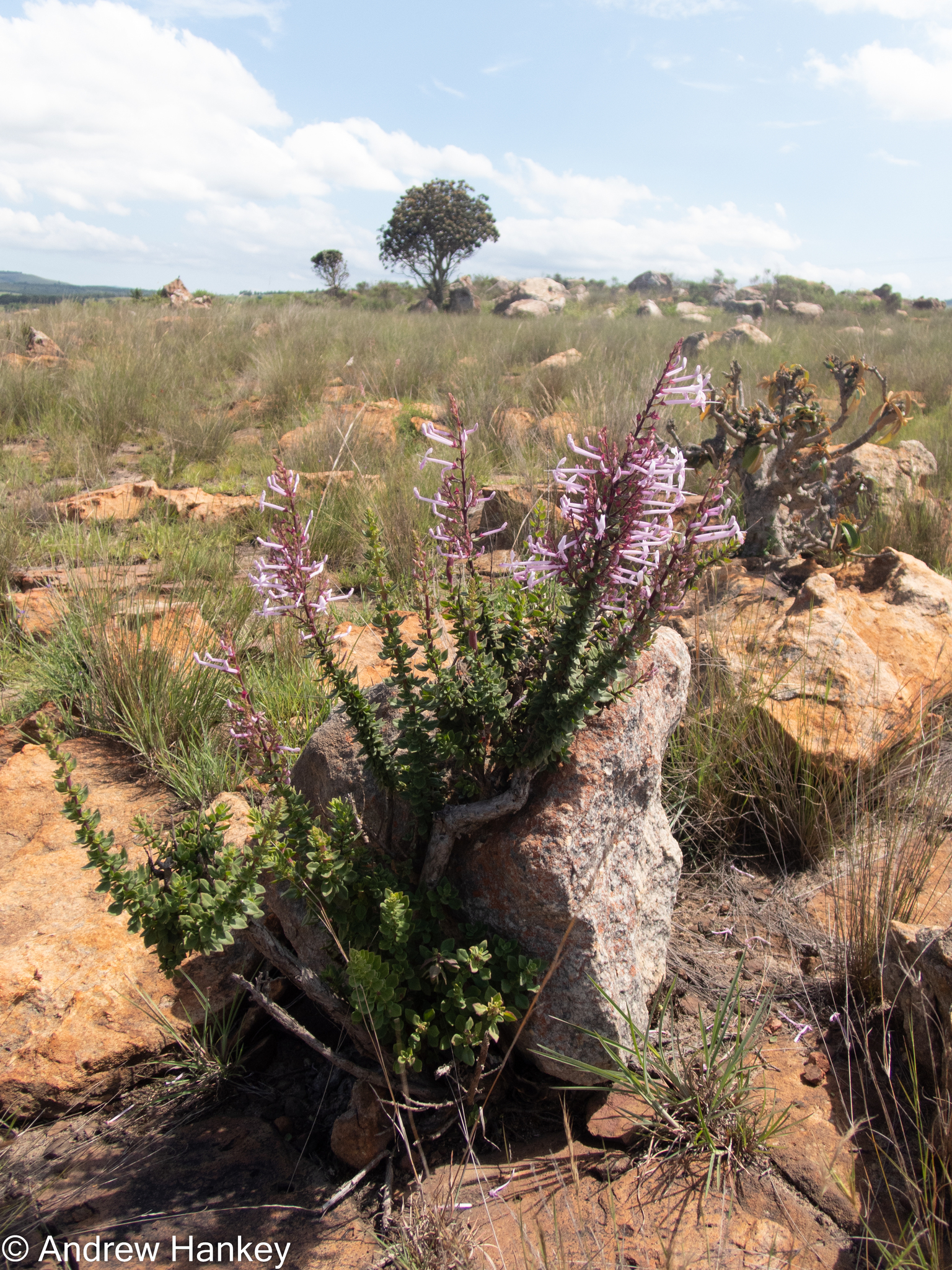

Thorncroftia greenii is a herb or small shrub, typically 0.5–1.0 m (1 ft 8 in – 3 ft 3 in) tall, arising from a thickened rootstock. Stems are erect, brittle, semi-succulent and sparsely branched, nearly circular in cross-section, pubescent with fine glandular and sparse non-glandular hairs.

Leaves are opposite, elliptic to obovate, 10–18 mm (0.39–0.71 in) long, with a rounded apex and entire margins (rarely with one or two small teeth near the tip); both surfaces are pubescent. The petiole is 5–6.5 mm (0.20–0.26 in) long.

The inflorescence is a terminal raceme on the main stem and upper branches, bearing single flowers in the axils of leaf-like bracts. The main axis is 120–200 mm (4.7–7.9 in) long. Flowers are borne on pedicels 4–9 mm (0.16–0.35 in) long. The calyx is 6–7 mm (0.24–0.28 in) long, densely covered with peltate glandular hairs; the upper lobe is ovate-lanceolate and acuminate, and the four lower teeth are triangular-lanceolate.

The corolla is light lilac, 28–30 mm (1.1–1.2 in) long, narrowly cylindrical and slightly laterally compressed, with glandular and non-glandular hairs. The upper lobes are broadly oblong, while the lateral lobes are narrowly elliptic and marked with mauve or purple speckles or lines. Stamens have light lilac filaments and dark purple anthers; pollen is orange-yellow. The style is light lilac with magenta lobes and elongates into position after the stamens have recoiled.

Thorncroftia greenii flowers from March to April.

It closely resembles T. longiflora, but the species do not overlap geographically.

== Etymology ==
The genus Thorncroftia is named for George Thorncroft (1857‒1934), an amateur botanist who collected extensively in the Barberton area of Mpumalanga province in South Africa.

The species epithet honours David Green (1932–2007), a farmer, amateur paleontologist, and amateur botanist who first collected the plant in 1996 and went on to cultivate it on his property. Barleria greenii, which he discovered in 1984, is named in his honour too. Barleria argillicola, Aloe inconspicua, and several other species are also known to science through his efforts. His collection of Drimia basutica in 1986 was the first in KwaZulu-Natal in a hundred years. He was murdered on his farm Rensburgspruit near Estcourt two years before T. greenii was published.

== See also ==
- List of Lamiaceae of South Africa
