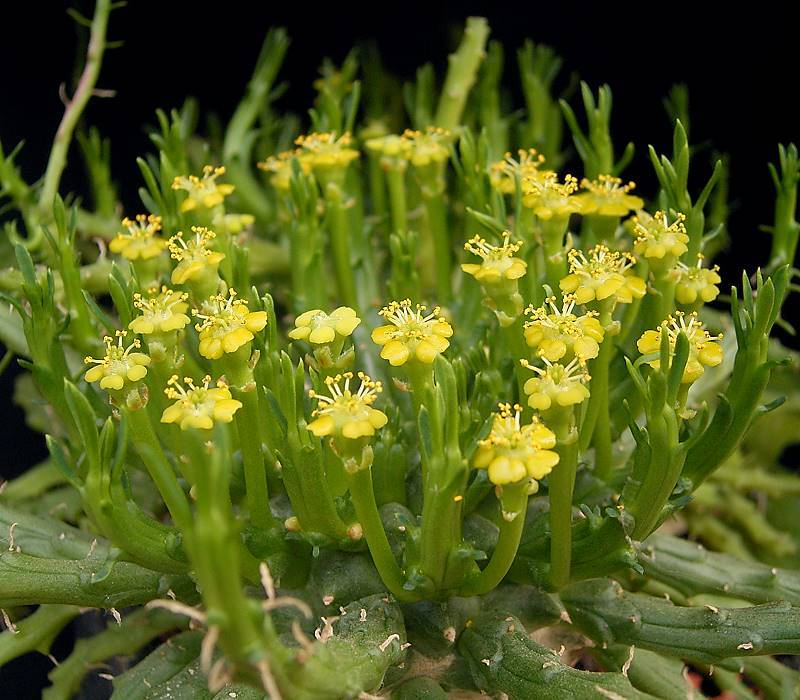
- CITES Appendix II (CITES)

Scientific classification
- Kingdom: Plantae
- Clade: Tracheophytes
- Clade: Angiosperms
- Clade: Eudicots
- Clade: Rosids
- Order: Malpighiales
- Family: Euphorbiaceae
- Genus: Euphorbia
- Species: E. flanaganii

Binomial name
- Euphorbia flanaganii N.E.Br. (1915)

Synonyms
- Euphorbia discreta N.E.Br. (1915); Euphorbia ernestii N.E.Br. (1915); Euphorbia franksiae N.E.Br. (1915); Euphorbia gatbergensis N.E.Br. (1915); Euphorbia passa N.E.Br. (1915); Euphorbia woodii N.E.Br. (1915)

= Euphorbia flanaganii =

Species of flowering plant

Euphorbia flanaganii, commonly known as Transkei medusa's head, is a succulent plant that belongs to the family Euphorbiaceae. It is endemic to South Africa. Due to the breadth of the Euphorbiaceae, little research specific to E. flanaganii has been conducted.

== Taxonomy ==
It is believed to be closely related to E. hypogaea and E. procumbens, resulting from a common speciation event. However, the phylogenetic association between the three species remains relatively unreliable, with values of only 53/.66 attributed to the linkage. Euphorbia flanaganii is in subgenus Athymalus, which comprises 150 species.

== Description ==
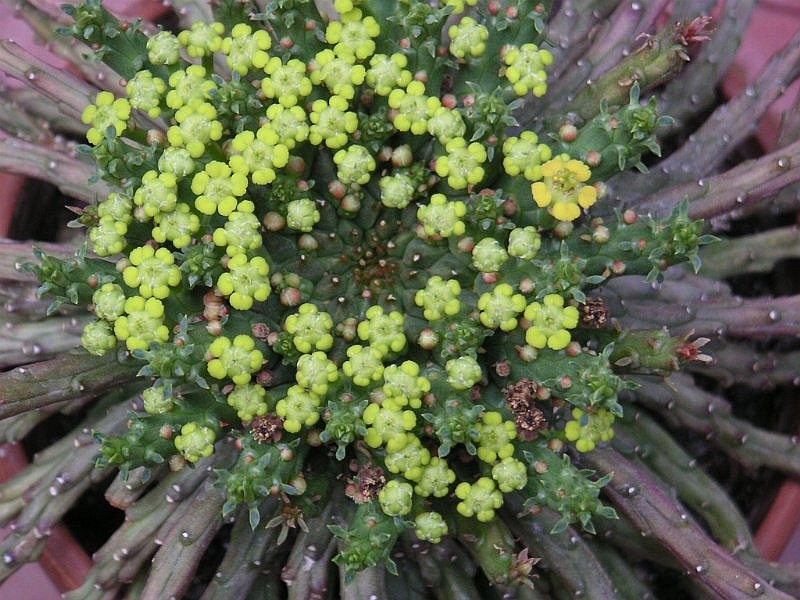
Inflorescence

It is an agglomerated, thorny, succulent plant with snake-like branches that has a swollen underground stem. It is a dwarf shrub with a size of 0.02 to 0.05 m in height that is found at an altitude of 30 to 185 meters. Leaves are rather small, only 10 mm long and 1 mm broad. Its branches grow horizontally, up to 400 mm in diameter. It has inflorescence in cyathium with a single, 4 mm long flower per flower stalk that bloom in late summer and autumn.

It has photosynthetic modified stems that lack, or have delayed development of, periderm. Careful observation of E. flanaganii specimens also reveals modified, needle-like leaves, radial geometric symmetry, and a seemingly tuberous above ground root structure.

== Distribution ==
Euphorbia flanaganii is native to the east-central and southeastern Cape Provinces and southern KwaZulu-Natal in South Africa.

== Evolution ==
Species within subgenus Athymalus, including E. flanaganii, are found only in arid regions such as the Arabian Peninsula, the Canary Islands, Madagascar, and South Africa. The historical and modern day geographical home of the subgenus, and the diversity level among species in the same region, suggest species in Athymalus are a lineage of early divergence. A large speciation event of Euphorbia is believed to have occurred over the course of 3 million to 10 million years ago, due to a significant change in climate, in what are now considered to be modern arid regions; the Athymalus subgenus is believed to have evolved during this period.

Given the present body of knowledge that pertains to other Euphorbia species found in the same regions as E. flanaganii, and historical evolutionary events, it is highly likely that E. flanaganii is roughly 3–10 million years old as well.
