= Thorncroftia malolotjaensis =

Scientific classification
- Kingdom: Plantae
- Clade: Tracheophytes
- Clade: Angiosperms
- Clade: Eudicots
- Clade: Asterids
- Order: Lamiales
- Family: Lamiaceae
- Genus: Thorncroftia
- Species: T. malolotjaensis

Binomial name
- Thorncroftia malolotjaensis K.Balkwill

Species of flowering plant

Thorncroftia malolotjaensis is a species of Thorncroftia, commonly known as the Malolotja whistlesweet. Endemic to Eswatini, it is restricted to the Malolotja Nature Reserve, where it grows on steep, rocky hillsides, often in shade thrown by Englerophytum magalismontanum.

== Description ==
Thorncroftia malolotjaensis is a semi-succulent, multi-stemmed suffrutex or small shrub growing up to about 1 m (3.3 ft) tall. The stems are slender, tapering from about 10 mm in diameter at the base to 3–5 mm (0.12–0.20 in) above, sparingly branched, and brittle towards the tips. They are covered in a mixture of fine non-glandular hairs and sessile glandular hairs.

The leaves are opposite, elliptic, and relatively small, measuring 12–20 mm (0.47–0.79 in) long and 7–9 mm (0.28–0.35 in) wide. They are succulent and finely hairy on both surfaces, with the midrib slightly sunken above and the veins only weakly raised below. The leaf tip is usually acute to blunt, and the margins are typically entire, though one to three small teeth may occur near the tip. The base is wedge-shaped, and the petiole is 4–8 mm (0.16–0.31 in) long.

The inflorescence is a terminal raceme, often accompanied by additional racemes arising from the upper leaf axils. The main axis is 7–9 cm (2.8–3.5 in) long. Flowers are solitary in the axils of leaf-like bracts that decrease in size towards the tip of the inflorescence. The flower stalks are 4.5–6 mm (0.18–0.24 in) long and often darken towards the tip.

The calyx is 6–8 mm (0.24–0.31 in) long and light green to pink, with a maroon upper lobe. It is densely hairy, and the calyx lobes are unequal, with the upper lobe broader and longer than the others.

The corolla is tubular, light lilac at the base and darker towards the tip, with a long, narrow tube measuring about 28–36 mm (1.1–1.4 in). The upper lobes appear triangular due to their folded margins, the lateral lobes are narrow and sharply pointed, and the lower lobe is boat-shaped and becomes reflexed as the flower opens.

The stamens have filaments about 6–8 mm (0.24–0.31 in) long, with dark purple anthers and greenish-orange pollen. The style is 7–10 mm (0.28–0.39 in) long and extends beyond the corolla after the stamens have recoiled.

T. malolotjaensis flowers from March to May.
