= Mary Gunn =

South African librarian and biographer (1899–1989)

Mary Davidson Gunn
- Born: 15 March 1899; Kirriemuir, Scotland.
- Died: 31 August 1989 (aged 90); Pretoria, South Africa
- Occupations: Librarian; biographer; historian
- Known for: Expanding and developing the Mary Gunn Library

Mary Davidson Gunn (15 March 1899 – 31 August 1989) was a South African librarian and biographer who developed and expanded the Mary Gunn Library into one of the most important resources on botany and biodiversity in Africa.

== Early life ==
Gunn was born in Kirriemuir in Scotland on 15 March 1899. Her father decided to emigrate with his family to South Africa after serving there in the Boer War. She was educated at the Gymnasium school and obtained employment as a clerk at the Division of Botany and Plant Pathology in Pretoria in September, 1916.

== Career as a librarian ==
She was assigned the responsibility of maintaining and building up the library of the Division of Botany by Dr Pole-Evans. Gunn specialised in two particular areas of research. She researched biographical information on early botanists and botanical illustrators, and became an authority on old botanical literature. Because of limited funds, various ways and means had to be devised to acquire treasures. She was very persuasive in getting rare and expensive books donated or sponsored to the library during her time as librarian. Ms Gunn's library was populated by her acquiring gifts, as well as purchasing and exchanging books and journals until she had enough of a variety for the public. To this day, the global exchange program remains one of the chief ways in which Mary Gunn Library gets new journals.

== Writing ==
With botanist Leslie Edward Wostall Codd, she co-authored Botanical Exploration of Southern Africa in 1981, a history of the country's plant collecting, collectors and early botanical illustrations. A follow-up was published in 1985. (Note: A revised and expanded version was reissued in 2010 by Glen and Germishuizen) She was known for specialising in non-contemporary botanists. A student once asked her a question about a contemporary botanist to which she replied "...I only deal with dead botanists, either kill him off or ask Codd next door!"

== Honours ==
The National Herbarium Library was renamed the Mary Gunn Library in her honour in 1970. In 1976 the Botanical Society of South Africa awarded Gunn the Harry Bolus Medal.
