= Thorncroftia coddii =

Scientific classification
- Kingdom: Plantae
- Clade: Tracheophytes
- Clade: Angiosperms
- Clade: Eudicots
- Clade: Asterids
- Order: Lamiales
- Family: Lamiaceae
- Genus: Thorncroftia
- Species: T. coddii

Binomial name
- Thorncroftia coddii Changwe & K.Balkwill

Species of flowering plant

Thorncroftia coddii is an endangered species of Thorncroftia commonly known as the Blyde River Canyon whistlesweet. It was first collected in 1953 by Dr Leslie Codd, who believed it to be Plectranthus succulentus, a species he would later rename Thorncroftia succulenta. It was only in 2025, after more examples were found in the wild, that the plant was described as a new species, distinct from T. succulenta.

It grows on quartzite cliffs and outcrops in the greater Blyde River Canyon, where some of its fragmented populations are threatened by the encroachment of alien trees and informal mining.

== Description ==
Thorncroftia coddii is a succulent-stemmed shrub, usually 80–120 cm (31–47 in) tall, with several ascending stems arising from a thickened rootstock. Stems are sparingly branched and densely pubescent.

Leaves are opposite, ovate-elliptic to obovate, 8 mm–18 mm × 4 mm–10 mm (0.31 in–0.71 in × 0.16 in–0.39 in), with rounded apices, cuneate bases, and crenate margins bearing 6–7 scallops per side; petioles 4–8 mm (0.16–0.31 in) long.

The inflorescence is a terminal, compact panicle, 12–24 cm (4.7–9.4 in) long, with progressively reduced, leaf-like bracts. The calyx is dark red to maroon, 5–7 mm (0.20–0.28 in) long, two-lipped, with unequal ovate-lanceolate teeth.

The corolla is narrowly tubular, laterally compressed, 35–38 mm (1.4–1.5 in) long, lilac to light mauve, darkening distally, with purple spotting on the lobes; the lower lip is shallowly boat-shaped and becomes reflexed with age. Stamens are 5–7 mm (0.20–0.28 in) long with dark purple anthers; the style extends beyond the stamens after anthesis.

T. coddii flowers from February to April (possibly in May, too).

== Etymology ==
The genus Thorncroftia is named for George Thorncroft (1857‒1934), an amateur botanist who collected extensively in the Barberton area of Mpumalanga, South Africa. The species epithet honours Dr Leslie Codd (1908–1999), the eminent South African botanist who first collected it.

== See also ==
- List of Lamiaceae of South Africa
