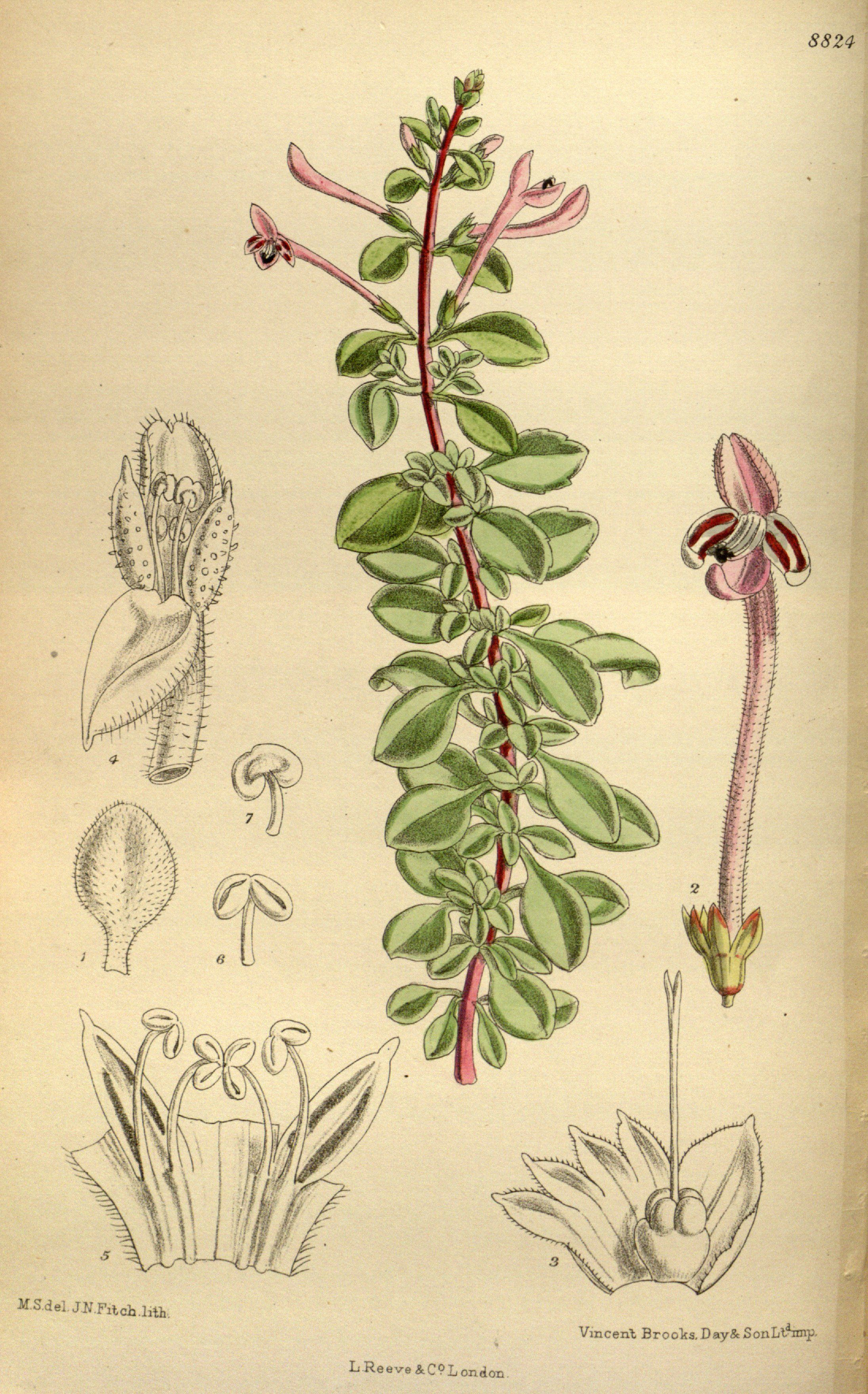
- Thorncroftia longiflora

Scientific classification
- Kingdom: Plantae
- Clade: Tracheophytes
- Clade: Angiosperms
- Clade: Eudicots
- Clade: Asterids
- Order: Lamiales
- Family: Lamiaceae
- Subfamily: Nepetoideae
- Tribe: Ocimeae
- Genus: Thorncroftia; N.E.Br.

= Thorncroftia =

Genus of flowering plants

Thorncroftia (whistlesweets) is a genus of flowering plants in the mint family, Lamiaceae, first described as a genus in 1912. It is native to southern Africa.

Species

1. Thorncroftia coddii Changwe & K.Balkwill – South Africa (Mpumalanga province)
2. Thorncroftia greenii Changwe & K.Balkwill – South Africa (KwaZulu-Natal province)
3. Thorncroftia longiflora N.E.Br – Eswatini, South Africa (Mpumalanga)
4. Thorncroftia lotteri T.J.Edwards & McMurtry – South Africa (Mpumalanga)
5. Thorncroftia media Codd – South Africa (Limpopo province)
6. Thorncroftia malolotjaensis K.Balkwill – Eswatini
7. Thorncroftia succulenta (R.A.Dyer & E.A.Bruce) Codd – South Africa (Limpopo)
8. Thorncroftia thorncroftii (S.Moore) Codd – Eswatini, South Africa (Limpopo and Mpumalanga)
