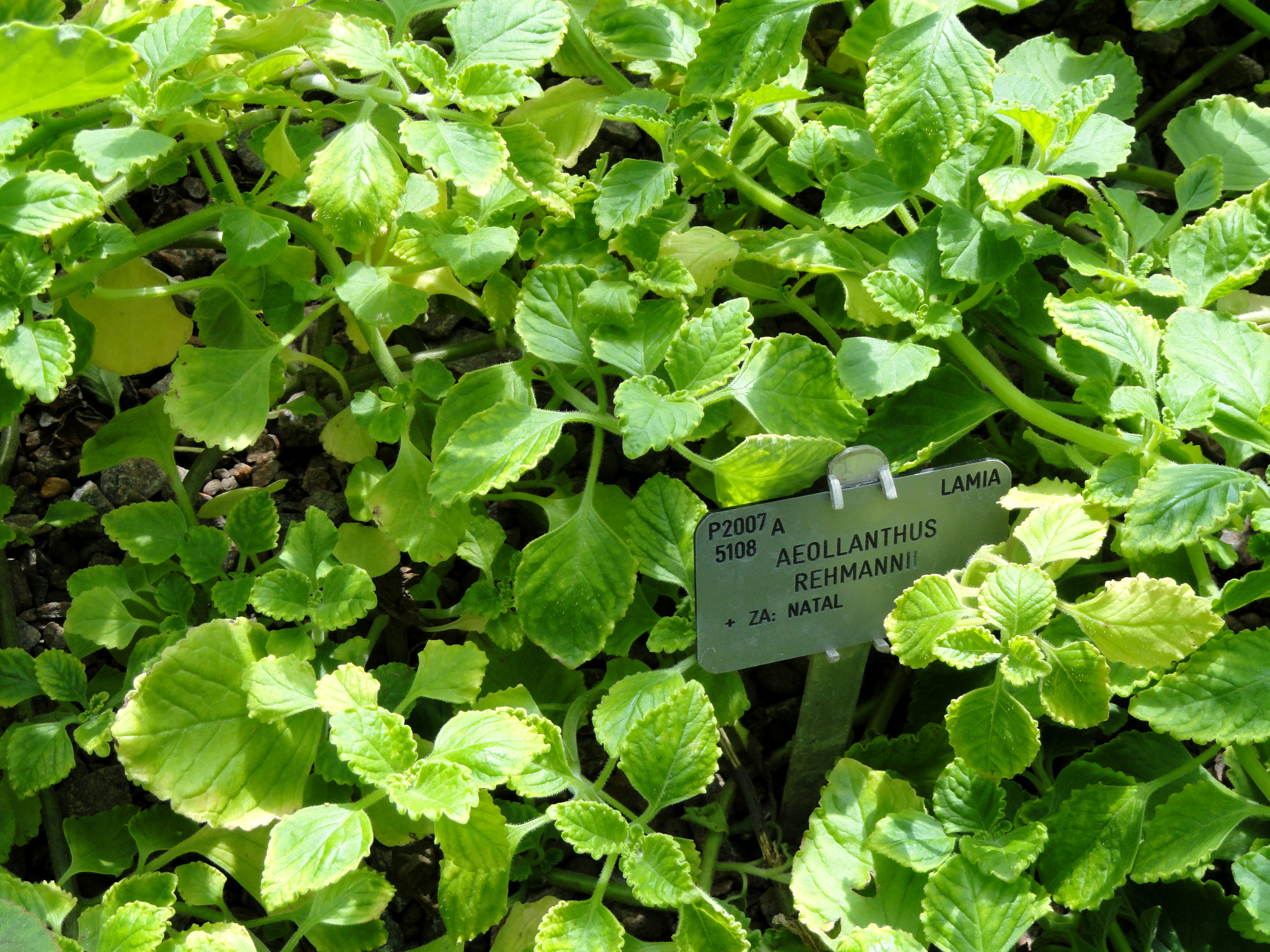
- Aeollanthus rehmannii

Scientific classification
- Kingdom: Plantae
- Clade: Tracheophytes
- Clade: Angiosperms
- Clade: Eudicots
- Clade: Asterids
- Order: Lamiales
- Family: Lamiaceae
- Subfamily: Nepetoideae
- Tribe: Ocimeae
- Genus: Aeollanthus; C.Mart. ex Spreng.

Synonyms
- Icomum Hua; Oxyotis Welw. ex Baker; Bovonia Chiov.

= Aeollanthus =

Genus of flowering plants

Aeollanthus (rocksage) is a genus in the mint family, Lamiaceae. All the species are native to Africa.

Species

- Aeollanthus abyssinicus Hochst. ex Benth. – Ethiopia
- Aeollanthus alternatus Ryding – Tanzania, Zambia
- Aeollanthus ambustus Oliv. – Central African Republic, Zaïre, South Sudan, Uganda
- Aeollanthus angolensis Ryding – Angola
- Aeollanthus angustifolius Ryding – Cameroon, Central African Republic, Nigeria
- Aeollanthus breviflorus De Wild. – Zaïre, Angola, Zambia
- Aeollanthus buchnerianus Briq. – from Zaïre and Uganda south to South Africa
- Aeollanthus candelabrum Briq. – Angola
- Aeollanthus caudatus Ryding – Angola
- Aeollanthus cucullatus Ryding – Cameroon, Nigeria
- Aeollanthus densiflorus Ryding – South Sudan, Uganda, Rwanda, Ethiopia, Kenya, Tanzania
- Aeollanthus elsholtzioides Briq. – Angola, Namibia
- Aeollanthus engleri Briq. – Cameroon, Zaïre, Angola, Zambia, Tanzania, Mozambique, Malawi
- Aeollanthus fruticosus Gürke – Zaïre, Zambia, Tanzania, Mozambique, Malawi
- Aeollanthus haumannii van Jaarsv. – Namibia
- Aeollanthus holstii Gürke – Zaïre, Tanzania, Rwanda
- Aeollanthus homblei De Wild – Zaïre, Zambia
- Aeollanthus lisowskii Ryding – Zaïre
- Aeollanthus lobatus N.E.Br. – Angola
- Aeollanthus myrianthus Baker – from Ethiopia south to Mozambique
- Aeollanthus namibiensis Ryding – Namibia
- Aeollanthus neglectus (Dinter) Launert – Angola, Zambia, Zimbabwe, Botswana, Namibia, Transvaal
- Aeollanthus paradoxus (Hua) Hua & Briq. – Senegal, Mali, Guinea
- Aeollanthus parvifolius Benth. – Mozambique, Eswatini, South Africa
- Aeollanthus petiolatus Ryding – Zaïre
- Aeollanthus pinnatifidus Hochst. ex Benth. – Ethiopia
- Aeollanthus plicatus Ryding – Angola
- Aeollanthus pubescens Benth. – western + central Africa from Liberia to Angola
- Aeollanthus rehmannii Gürke – eastern + southern Africa from Tanzania to South Africa
- Aeollanthus repens Oliv. – western Africa from Sudan to Mozambique
- Aeollanthus rivularis Hiern – Angola
- Aeollanthus rydingianus van Jaarsv. & A.E.van Wyk – Namibia
- Aeollanthus saxatilis J.Duvign. & Denaeyer – Zaïre
- Aeollanthus sedoides Hiern – Angola
- Aeollanthus serpiculoides Baker – Tanzania, Malawi, Mozambique, Zimbabwe
- Aeollanthus stuhlmannii Gürke – Tanzania
- Aeollanthus suaveolens Mart. ex Spreng. – central southern Africa
- Aeollanthus subacaulis (Baker) Hua & Briq. – central Africa from Cameroon and Tanzania south to Zimbabwe
- Aeollanthus subintegrus Ryding – Zaïre, Tanzania, Angola, Zambia
- Aeollanthus trifidus Ryding – Nigeria, Cameroon
- Aeollanthus tuberosus Hiern – Angola
- Aeollanthus ukamensis Gürke – Tanzania, Zambia, Mozambique, Zimbabwe, Malawi
- Aeollanthus viscosus Ryding – Mozambique, Zimbabwe
- Aeollanthus zanzibaricus S.Moore – Kenya, Tanzania, Somalia
