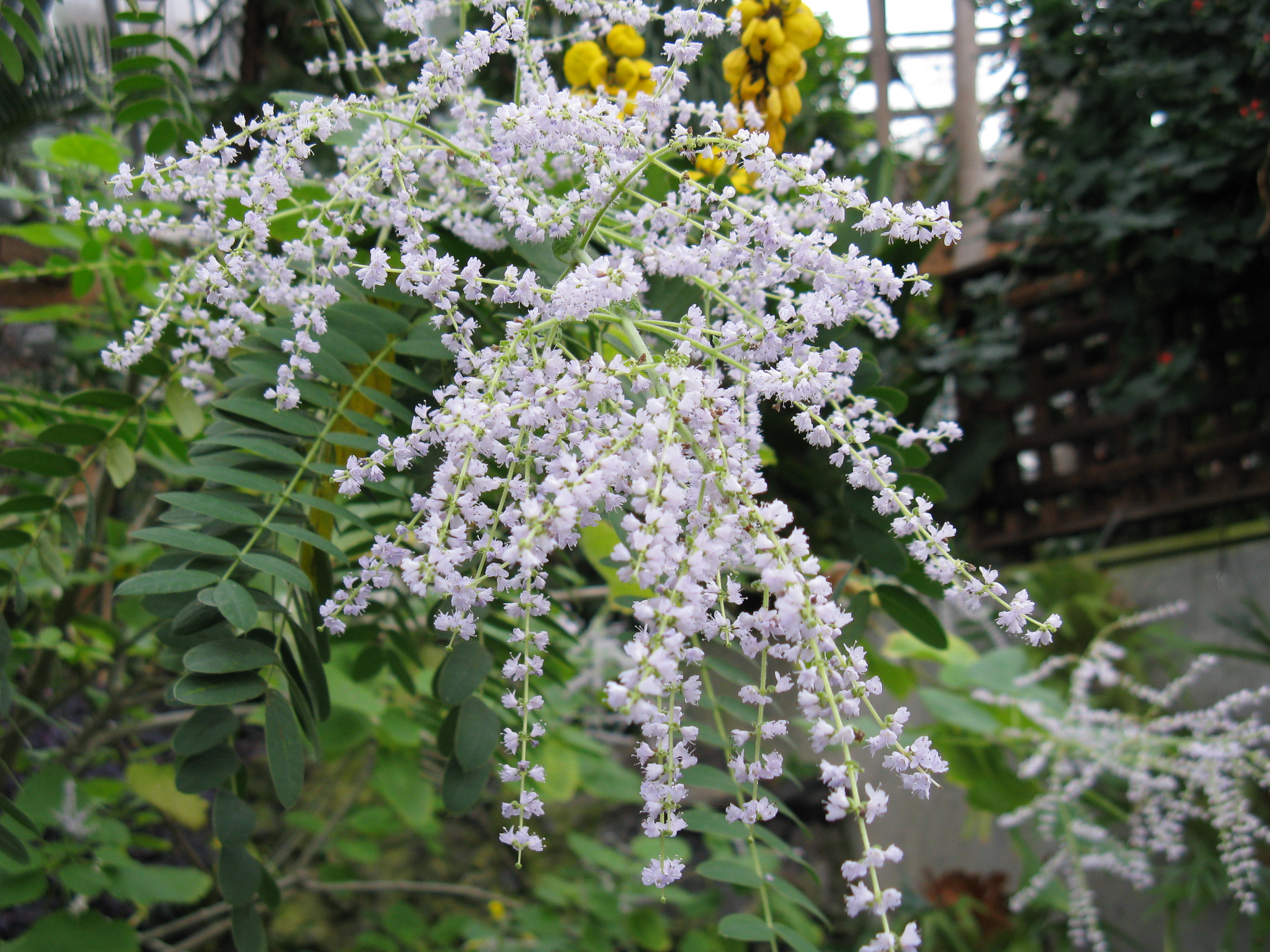
- Tetradenia riparia

Scientific classification
- Kingdom: Plantae
- Clade: Tracheophytes
- Clade: Angiosperms
- Clade: Eudicots
- Clade: Asterids
- Order: Lamiales
- Family: Lamiaceae
- Subfamily: Nepetoideae
- Tribe: Ocimeae
- Genus: Tetradenia; Benth.

Synonyms
- Iboza N.E.Br.

= Tetradenia =

Genus of flowering plants

Tetradenia (also known as gingerbush) is a genus of plants in the family Lamiaceae, first described in 1830. It is native to Africa, including Madagascar.

== Species ==
- Tetradenia bainesii (N.E.Br.) Phillipson & C.F.Steyn - Zimbabwe, Mozambique, Eswatini, KwaZulu-Natal
- Tetradenia barberae (N.E.Br.) Codd - Cape Province
- Tetradenia brevispicata (N.E.Br.) Codd - Zimbabwe, Namibia, Botswana, Transvaal
- Tetradenia clementiana Phillipson - Madagascar
- Tetradenia cordata Phillipson - Madagascar
- Tetradenia discolor Phillipson - Zambia, Zaire, Zimbabwe, Malawi, Tanzania
- Tetradenia falafa Phillipson - Madagascar
- Tetradenia fruticosa Benth. - Madagascar
- Tetradenia galpinii (N.E.Br.) Phillipson & C.F.Steyn - southeast Africa from Tanzania to Eswatini
- Tetradenia goudotii Briq. - Madagascar
- Tetradenia herbacea Phillipson - Madagascar
- Tetradenia hildeana Phillipson - Madagascar
- Tetradenia isaloensis Phillipson - Madagascar
- Tetradenia kaokoensis van Jaarsv. & A.E.van Wyk - Namibia
- Tetradenia multiflora (Benth.) Phillipson - Ethiopia
- Tetradenia nervosa Codd - Madagascar
- Tetradenia riparia (Hochst.) Codd - southern Africa from Angola + Malawi to Eswatini
- Tetradenia tanganyikae Phillipson - Malawi, Tanzania, Zambia
- Tetradenia tuberosa T.J.Edwards - KwaZulu-Natal
- Tetradenia urticifolia (Baker) Phillipson - eastern + central Africa from Sudan + Eritrea south to Zaire and Tanzania
