= Equilabium petiolare =

Conservation status
- Least Concern (SANBI Red List)

Scientific classification
- Kingdom: Plantae
- Clade: Embryophytes
- Clade: Tracheophytes
- Clade: Angiosperms
- Clade: Eudicots
- Clade: Asterids
- Order: Lamiales
- Family: Lamiaceae
- Genus: Equilabium
- Species: E. petiolare

Binomial name
- Equilabium petiolare (Benth.) Mwany. & A.J.Paton

Synonyms
- Plectranthus petiolare Benth.; Plectranthus kuntzei Gürke

Species of flowering plant

Equilabium petiolare is a species of flowering plant in the family Lamiaceae. It is native to southern Mozambique and South Africa.

== Description ==
This species is a perennial, freely branched herb growing up to 1 m (3 ft 3 in) tall. The stems spread or ascend and are fairly densely hairy, with noticeable tufts of longer hairs at the nodes.

The leaves are borne on long stalks 20–150 mm (0.79–5.91 in) long. The leaf blades are thin-textured and broadly ovate to triangular in shape, measuring 40–140 mm (1.6–5.5 in) long and 35–110 mm (1.4–4.3 in) wide. Both surfaces are sparsely to fairly densely covered with stiff hairs, and the undersides show tiny colourless gland dots. Leaf tips range from blunt to pointed, the bases are truncate to slightly heart-shaped, and the margins are coarsely scalloped to toothed, often with smaller secondary teeth.

The inflorescence is usually unbranched or has one or two pairs of short branches near the base, forming racemes 100–250 mm (3.9–9.8 in) long. The flowers occur in small, sessile clusters of one to three, forming loose whorls of two to six flowers spaced 10–30 mm (0.39–1.18 in) apart.

The calyx reaches up to 8 mm (0.31 in) in fruit and is covered with fine glandular hairs. The corolla is deep violet to purple, often with bluish lips, and measures 12–15 mm (0.47–0.59 in) long. The floral tube is gently S-shaped, narrow at the base and widening towards the throat. The upper lip is 6–8 mm (0.24–0.31 in) long, while the lower lip is shallowly boat-shaped and 7–9 mm (0.28–0.35 in) long. The stamens are free and 4–5 mm (0.16–0.20 in) long.

== Distribution and habitat ==
In South Africa, Equilabium petiolare grows in shade in subtropical coastal forests and bushveld from the Port St Johns area of the Eastern Cape through KwaZulu-Natal and inland to the Kaap River valley in Mpumalanga. It is also found in southern Mozambique.

== See also ==
- List of Lamiaceae of South Africa
