= Leslie Codd =

South African plant taxonomist (1908-1999)

Leslie Edward Wostall Codd
- photo by Adela Romanowski
- Born: 16 September 1908; Dundee, South Africa
- Died: 3 March 1999 (aged 90); Pretoria

Leslie Edward Wostall Codd (16 September 1908 in Vants Drift, Dundee, District, Natal – 2 March 1999 in Pretoria), was a South African plant taxonomist.

== Life ==
Codd was born in 1908. He attended the Natal University College where he obtained an M.Sc in 1928. He continued his studies at Cambridge University in 1929, and the Imperial College of Tropical Agriculture in Trinidad in 1930, where he met his future wife, Cynthia. He worked with the Department of Agriculture in British Guiana between 1931 and 1936. In 1937 he was appointed to the Pasture Research Section of the Department of Agriculture in Pretoria. In 1941 he was awarded a D.Sc degree by the University of South Africa.

In 1945 he assumed the post of Officer-in-Charge at the Prinshof Experiment Station in the Division of Botany, where he was involved with the selection, growing and testing of pasture grasses. At the same time he was in charge of the Botanical Survey of South Africa.

While stationed at Prinshof he frequently visited the Kruger National Park on plant collecting trips. He saw the need for an informal botanical guide to the reserve and in 1951 produced "Trees and Shrubs of the Kruger National Park", one of the most popular items in the series Memoirs of the Botanical Survey of South Africa. With librarian Mary Gunn, he co-authored Botanical Exploration of Southern Africa in 1981, a history of the country's plant collecting, collectors and early botanical illustrations, with a follow-up in 1985. (Note: A revised and expanded version was reissued in 2010 by Glen and Germishuizen) Gunn was known for specialising in non-contemporary botanists. A student once asked her a question about a contemporary botanist to which she replied "...I only deal with dead botanists, either kill him off or ask Codd next door!"

He succeeded Robert Allen Dyer as director of the Botanical Research Institute from 1963 until his retirement in 1973, and worked in the Flora Research Section thereafter.

Codd is commemorated in numerous specific names, including Berkheya coddii, Brachystelma coddii, Agapanthus coddii, Thorncroftia coddii, and others. His specimens number more than 10,000 (PRE, K, SRGH) and are mainly South African, with about 500 having come from Caprivi and Barotseland in 1952.

== Awards & honours ==
- 1957–58 President of Section B of SA Assoc. for the Adv. of Sc.
- 1961 President of the SA Biological Soc.
- 1977 SA Medal by SA Assoc. for the Adv. of Sc.
- 1979 SA Medal for Botany
- 1982 Senior Captain Scott Memorial Medal by the South African Biological Society.

== Bibliography ==
- Brummitt, R. K.; C. E. Powell (1992). Authors of Plant Names. Royal Botanic Gardens, Kew. ISBN 1-84246-085-4.
