= List of Stachys species =

Stachys is a genus of flowering plants in the family Lamiaceae. Plants of the World Online currently accepts 373 species. The genus is probably paraphyletic.

== A ==
- Stachys acerosa Boiss.
- Stachys aculeolata Hook.f.
- Stachys adulterina Hemsl.
- Stachys aegyptiaca Pers.
- Stachys aethiopica L.
- Stachys affinis Bunge
- Stachys afra E.Mey. ex Benth.
- Stachys agraria Schltdl. & Cham.
- Stachys ahmetsavranii Doğu & Bağcı
- Stachys ajugoides Benth.
- Stachys alabamica B.R.Keener & L.J.Davenp.
- Stachys albanica Markgr.
- Stachys albens A.Gray
- Stachys albicaulis Lindl.
- Stachys albiflora N.E.Br.
- Stachys albotomentosa Ramamoorthy
- Stachys aleurites Boiss. & Heldr.
- Stachys alpigena T.C.E.Fr.
- Stachys alpina L.
- Stachys amanica P.H.Davis
- Stachys × ambigua Sm.
- Stachys anamurensis Sümbül
- Stachys andongensis Hiern
- Stachys angustifolia M.Bieb.
- Stachys anisochila Vis. & Pancic
- Stachys annua (L.) L.
- Stachys antalyensis Ayaşlıgil & P.H.Davis
- Stachys aperta Epling
- Stachys appalachiana D.B.Poind. & J.B.Nelson
- Stachys arabica Hornem.
- Stachys arachnoidea Codd
- Stachys araucana Phil.
- Stachys arenaria Vahl
- Stachys arenariiformis Rouy
- Stachys argillicola Sebsebe
- Stachys aristata Greenm.
- Stachys arrecta L.H.Bailey
- Stachys arriagana B.L.Turner
- Stachys arvensis (L.) L.
- Stachys aspera Michx.
- Stachys asperata Hedge
- Stachys atherocalyx K.Koch
- Stachys aucheri Benth.
- Stachys aurea Benth.

== B ==
- Stachys babunensis Micevski
- Stachys bakeri Briq.
- Stachys balansae Boiss. & Kotschy
- Stachys balensis Sebsebe
- Stachys bayburtensis R.Bhattacharjee & Hub.-Mor.
- Stachys baytopiorum Kit Tan & Yildiz
- Stachys beckeana Dörfl. & Hayek
- Stachys benthamiana Boiss.
- Stachys bergii G.A.Mulligan & D.B.Munro
- Stachys bhattacharjeeae Ö.Güner
- Stachys bigelovii A.Gray
- Stachys bithynica Boiss.
- Stachys bizensis Schweinf. ex Baker
- Stachys × bodeana Bunge
- Stachys bogotensis Kunth
- Stachys bolusii Skan
- Stachys bombycina Boiss.
- Stachys boraginoides Schltdl. & Cham.
- Stachys brachiata Bojer ex Benth.
- Stachys brachyclada de Noé
- Stachys bridgesii Benth.
- Stachys bullata Benth.
- Stachys burchelliana Launert
- Stachys burgsdorffioides (Benth.) Boiss.
- Stachys × burrii P.H.Davis
- Stachys buttleri R.R.Mill
- Stachys byzantina K.Koch

== C ==
- Stachys calcicola Epling
- Stachys candida Bory & Chaub.
- Stachys canescens Bory & Chaub.
- Stachys carduchorum (R.Bhattacharjee) Rech.f.
- Stachys caroliniana J.B.Nelson & D.A.Rayner
- Stachys cataonica R.Bhattacharjee & Hub.-Mor.
- Stachys chamissonis Benth.
- Stachys chasmosericea Ayasligil & P.H.Davis
- Stachys chinensis Bunge ex Benth.
- Stachys choruhensis Kit Tan & Sorger
- Stachys chrysantha Boiss. & Heldr.
- Stachys circinata L'Hér.
- Stachys citrina Boiss. & Heldr. ex Benth.
- Stachys clingmanii Small
- Stachys coccinea Ortega
- Stachys collina Brandegee
- Stachys comosa Codd
- Stachys cordata Riddell
- Stachys cordifolia Prain
- Stachys corsica Pers.
- Stachys costaricensis Briq.
- Stachys cretica L.
- Stachys × cryptadenia Rech.f.
- Stachys cudiensis Fırat & Ö.Güner
- Stachys cuhacioglui Yıldırım & Ö.Güner
- Stachys cuneata Banks ex Benth.
- Stachys cydni Kotschy ex Gemici & Leblebici
- Stachys cymbalaria Briq.

== D ==
- Stachys darcyana A.Pool
- Stachys debilis Kunth
- Stachys didymantha Brenan
- Stachys × digenea Legué
- Stachys dinteri Launert
- Stachys distans Benth.
- Stachys diversifolia Boiss.
- Stachys dregeana Benth.
- Stachys drummondii Benth.
- Stachys durandiana Coss.
- Stachys duriaei de Noé

== E ==
- Stachys ehrenbergii Boiss.
- Stachys elliptica Kunth
- Stachys eplingii J.B.Nelson
- Stachys erectiuscula Gürke
- Stachys eremicola Epling
- Stachys eriantha Benth.
- Stachys euadenia P.H.Davis
- Stachys euboica Rech.f.

== F ==
- Stachys fendleri Briq.
- Stachys filifolia Hedge
- Stachys flavescens Benth.
- Stachys flexuosa Skan
- Stachys floccosa Benth.
- Stachys floridana Shuttlew. ex Benth.
- Stachys fominii Sosn. ex Grossh.
- Stachys fontqueri Pau
- Stachys forsythii Hedge
- Stachys fragillima Bornm.
- Stachys fruticulosa M.Bieb.

== G ==
- Stachys gaziantepensis Dinç & Dogu
- Stachys geobombycis C.Y.Wu
- Stachys germanica L.
- Stachys gilliesii Benth.
- Stachys glandulibracteata Y.B.Harv.
- Stachys glandulifera Post
- Stachys glandulosa Hutch. & E.A.Bruce
- Stachys glandulosissima Floden
- Stachys glechomifolia Nábelek
- Stachys globosa Epling
- Stachys glutinosa L.
- Stachys gossweileri G.Taylor
- Stachys goulimyi Rech.f.
- Stachys graciliflora C.Presl
- Stachys graeca Boiss. & Heldr.
- Stachys grahamii Benth.
- Stachys grandidentata Lindl.
- Stachys grandifolia E.Mey.
- Stachys graveolens Nábelek
- Stachys guyoniana de Noé ex Batt.

== H ==
- Stachys hakkariensis Akçiçek & Firat
- Stachys hamata Epling
- Stachys harkerae J.G.González
- Stachys harleyana A.Pool
- Stachys hebens Epling
- Stachys heraclea All.
- Stachys herrerae Epling
- Stachys herrerana Rzed. & Calderón
- Stachys hians Briq.
- Stachys hildebrandtii Vatke
- Stachys hintoniorum B.L.Turner
- Stachys hispida Pursh
- Stachys hissarica Regel
- Stachys huber-morathii R.Bhattacharjee
- Stachys huetii Boiss.
- Stachys huillensis Hiern
- Stachys humbertii Hedge
- Stachys humifusa Burch. ex Benth.
- Stachys hydrophila Boiss.
- Stachys hyssopifolia Michx.
- Stachys hyssopoides Burch. ex Benth.

== I – J ==
- Stachys iberica M.Bieb.
- Stachys ilicifolius (Schrenk ex Fisch. & C.A.Mey.) Sennikov
- Stachys iltisii J.B.Nelson
- Stachys inanis Hausskn. & Bornm.
- Stachys inflata Benth.
- Stachys intermedia Aiton
- Stachys ionica Halácsy
- Stachys iraqensis R.Bhattacharjee
- Stachys istanbulensis Ö.Güner
- Stachys iva Griseb.
- Stachys jaimehintonii B.L.Turner
- Stachys jijigaensis Sebsebe

== K ==
- Stachys keerlii Benth.
- Stachys kermanshahensis Rech.f.
- Stachys ketenoglui Kaynak, Daskin & Yilmaz
- Stachys komarovii Knorring
- Stachys kotschyi Boiss. & Hohen.
- Stachys kouyangensis (Vaniot) Dunn
- Stachys kulalensis Sebsebe
- Stachys kuntzei Gürke
- Stachys kurdica Boiss. & Hohen.

== L ==
- Stachys lallaniana R.Kr.Singh & Sanjeet Kumar
- Stachys lamarckii Benth.
- Stachys lamioides Benth.
- Stachys langmaniae Rzed. & Calderón
- Stachys lanigera (Bornm.) Rech.f.
- Stachys latidens Small
- Stachys lavandulifolia Vahl
- Stachys laxa Boiss. & Buhse
- Stachys leucoglossa Griseb.
- Stachys × leucomalla Bornm. & Gauba
- Stachys libanotica Benth.
- Stachys lindenii Benth.
- Stachys linearis Burch. ex Benth.
- Stachys longespicata Boiss. & Kotschy
- Stachys longiflora Boiss. & Balansa
- Stachys lurestanica Jamzad
- Stachys lyallii Benth.

== M ==
- Stachys macraei Benth.
- Stachys macrotricha Rech.f. & Goulimy
- Stachys manantlanensis B.L.Turner
- Stachys mandoniana Briq.
- Stachys marashica Ilçim, Çenet & Dadandi
- Stachys mardinensis (Post) R.R.Mill
- Stachys maritima Gouan
- Stachys marrubiifolia Viv.
- Stachys matthewsii G.P.Fleming, J.B.Nelson & J.F.Towns.
- Stachys × medebachensis Feld & O.Koenen
- Stachys megalodonta Hausskn. & Bornm. ex P.H.Davis
- Stachys melampyroides Hand.-Mazz.
- Stachys menthifolia Vis.
- Stachys menthoides Kotschy & Boiss.
- Stachys mexicana Benth.
- Stachys mialhesii de Noé
- Stachys milanii Petrov ex Magnier
- Stachys milasensis Ö.Güner
- Stachys minor (Boiss.) Akçiçek & Dirmenci
- Stachys × mirabilis Rouy
- Stachys mohinora B.L.Turner
- Stachys mollissima Willd.
- Stachys moorei B.L.Turner
- Stachys mouretii Batt. & Pit.
- Stachys mucronata Sieber ex Spreng.
- Stachys multicaulis Benth.
- Stachys munzurdagensis R.Bhattacharjee

== N ==
- Stachys namazdaghensis Yild.
- Stachys natalensis Hochst.
- Stachys nelsonii B.R.Keener & L.J.Davenp.
- Stachys nemorivaga Briq.
- Stachys nepetifolia Desf.
- Stachys nephrophylla Rech.f.
- Stachys neurocalycina Boiss.
- Stachys nigricans Benth.
- Stachys nivea Labill.
- Stachys nubilorum Epling

== O ==
- Stachys obliqua Waldst. & Kit.
- Stachys oblongifolia Wall. ex Benth.
- Stachys obscura Boiss. & Balansa
- Stachys obtusicrena Boiss.
- Stachys obtusifolia MacOwan
- Stachys ochroleuca Phil.
- Stachys ocymastrum (L.) Briq.
- Stachys oligantha Baker
- Stachys oreophila Hedge

== P ==
- Stachys palaestina L.
- Stachys palustris L.
- Stachys paneiana Mouterde
- Stachys pannosa Phil.
- Stachys parolinii Vis.
- Stachys patula Griseb.
- Stachys pauli Grossh.
- Stachys penanevada B.L.Turner
- Stachys peruviana Dombey ex Benth.
- Stachys petrokosmos Rech.f.
- Stachys philippiana Vatke
- Stachys pilifera Benth.
- Stachys pilosa Nutt.
- Stachys pilosissima M.Martens & Galeotti
- Stachys pinardii Boiss.
- Stachys pinetorum Boiss. & Balansa
- Stachys pittieri Briq.
- Stachys plumosa Griseb.
- Stachys pringlei Greenm.
- Stachys pseudohumifusa Sebsebe
- Stachys pseudonigricans Gürke
- Stachys pseudophlomis C.Y.Wu
- Stachys pseudopinardii R.Bhattacharjee & Hub.-Mor.
- Stachys pumila Banks & Sol.
- Stachys pusilla (Wedd.) Briq.
- Stachys pycnantha Benth.
- Stachys pyramidalis J.K.Morton

== R ==
- Stachys radicans Epling
- Stachys ramosissima Montbret & Aucher ex Benth.
- Stachys recta L.
- Stachys rehmannii Skan
- Stachys reptans Hedge
- Stachys reticulata Codd
- Stachys richardiana R.Kr.Singh
- Stachys riederi Cham.
- Stachys rigida Nutt. ex Benth.
- Stachys riparia A.Pool
- Stachys rivularis J.M.Wood & M.S.Evans
- Stachys rizeensis R.Bhattacharjee
- Stachys rosea (Desf.) Boiss.
- Stachys rothrockii A.Gray
- Stachys rotundifolia Moc. & Sessé ex Benth.
- Stachys rubella Hedge
- Stachys rudatisii Skan
- Stachys rugosa Aiton
- Stachys rupestris Montbret & Aucher ex Benth.

== S ==
- Stachys salisii Jord. & Fourr.
- Stachys sanchezii Rzed. & A.García
- Stachys sandersii B.L.Turner
- Stachys saturejoides Montbret & Aucher ex Benth.
- Stachys saxicola Coss. & Balansa
- Stachys scaberula Vatke
- Stachys scabrida Skan
- Stachys schimperi Vatke
- Stachys semsurensis Firat
- Stachys serbica Pancic
- Stachys sericantha P.H.Davis
- Stachys sericea Cav.
- Stachys sericophylla Halácsy
- Stachys sessilifolia E.Mey.
- Stachys sessilis Gürke
- Stachys setifera C.A.Mey.
- Stachys siirtensis Ö.Güner & Akçiçek
- Stachys simplex Schltr.
- Stachys × sintenisii Gand.
- Stachys sivasica Kit Tan & Yildiz
- Stachys sparsipilosa R.Bhattacharjee & Hub.-Mor.
- Stachys spathulata Burch. ex Benth.
- Stachys spectabilis Choisy ex DC.
- Stachys speluncarum Contandr. & Quézel
- Stachys sphaerodonta Baker
- Stachys spinosa L.
- Stachys spinulosa Sm.
- Stachys splendens Wall. ex Benth.
- Stachys spreitzenhoferi Heldr.
- Stachys sprucei Briq.
- Stachys spruneri Boiss.
- Stachys stebbinsii G.A.Mulligan & D.B.Munro
- Stachys stricta Greene
- Stachys strictiflora C.Y.Wu
- Stachys subaphylla Rech.f.
- Stachys sublobata Skan
- Stachys subnuda Montbret & Aucher ex Benth.
- Stachys swainsonii Benth.
- Stachys sylvatica L.

== T ==
- Stachys taliensis C.Y.Wu
- Stachys talyschensis Kapeller
- Stachys tamaulipana B.L.Turner
- Stachys tenerrima Epling
- Stachys tenuifolia Willd.
- Stachys tetragona Boiss. & Heldr.
- Stachys thirkei K.Koch
- Stachys thracica Davidov
- Stachys thunbergii Benth.
- Stachys thuspeinantha Sennikov
- Stachys tlaxiacana B.L.Turner
- Stachys tmolea Boiss.
- Stachys torresii B.L.Turner
- Stachys tournefortii Poir.
- Stachys trichophylla Baker
- Stachys trinervis Aitch. & Hemsl.
- Stachys truncata Kunze ex Benth.
- Stachys tubulosa MacOwan
- Stachys tundjeliensis Kit Tan & Sorger
- Stachys turcomanica Trautv.
- Stachys turkestanica (Regel) Popov ex Knorring
- Stachys turneri Rzed. & Calderón
- Stachys tymphaea Hausskn.
- Stachys tysonii Skan

== U – V ==
- Stachys uniflora A.Pool
- Stachys urticoides Epling
- Stachys venezuelana Briq.
- Stachys venulosa Greene
- Stachys veroniciformis Rech.f.
- Stachys virgata Bory & Chaub.
- Stachys viscosa Montbret & Aucher ex Benth.
- Stachys viticina Boiss.
- Stachys vulnerabilis Rzed. & Calderón
- Stachys vuralii Yildiz, Dirmenci & Akçiçek

== W – X ==
- Stachys willemsei Kit Tan & Hedge
- Stachys woronowii (Schischk. ex Grossh.) R.R.Mill
- Stachys xanthantha C.Y.Wu

== Y – Z ==
- Stachys yemenensis Hedge
- Stachys yildirimlii Dinç
- Stachys yingzuijieensis L.Wu & Y.P.Chen
- Stachys zepcensis Formánek
- Stachys zeyheri Skan
- Stachys zoharyana Eig
