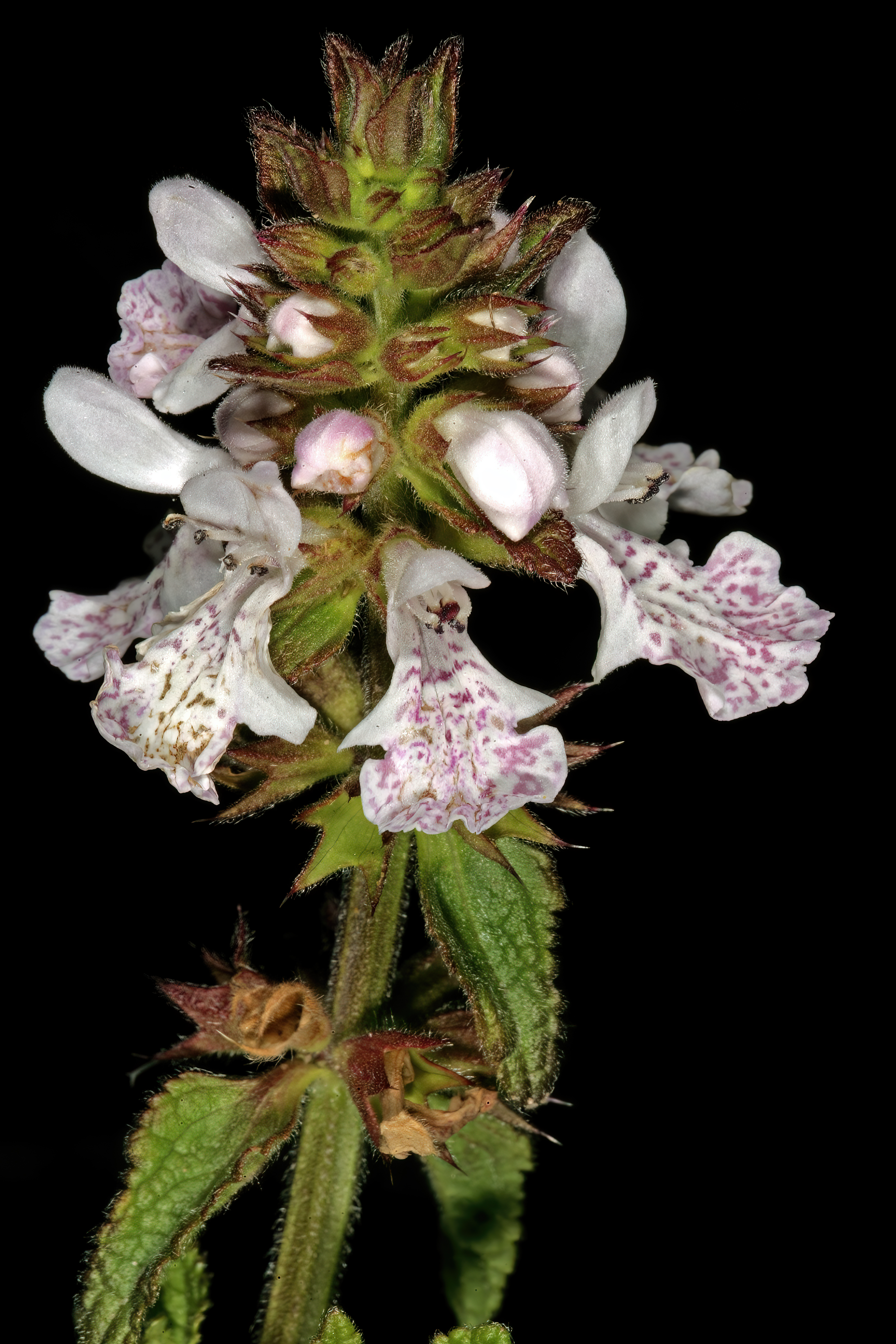

Conservation status
- Least Concern (SANBI Red List)

Scientific classification
- Kingdom: Plantae
- Clade: Embryophytes
- Clade: Tracheophytes
- Clade: Angiosperms
- Clade: Eudicots
- Clade: Asterids
- Order: Lamiales
- Family: Lamiaceae
- Genus: Stachys
- Species: S. bolusii

Binomial name
- Stachys bolusii Skan

= Stachys bolusii =

Species of flowering plant

Stachys bolusii, the strandveld woundwort, is a species of hedgenettle endemic to South Africa′s Western Cape province.

== Description ==
This species is a perennial herb with spreading to ascending, branched stems up to 0.45 m (1 ft 6 in) long. The stems are sparsely to fairly densely covered with long spreading to backward-pointing hairs, with some gland-tipped hairs also present.

The leaves are borne on stalks, with broadly ovate blades, the larger leaves 30–55 mm (1.2–2.2 in) long. Both surfaces are fairly densely hairy, with blunt to rounded tips and deeply heart-shaped bases. The margins are regularly and somewhat coarsely scalloped, with about ten to fourteen rounded teeth on each side.

The inflorescence is simple and scarcely tapering, up to 150 mm (5.9 in) long, composed of several whorls each bearing six flowers. The bracts are densely hairy and leaf-like, especially the lower ones, becoming smaller upwards but remaining longer than the corolla. The flowers are nearly stalkless. The calyx is densely hairy and about 7 mm (0.28 in) long. The corolla is white with purple or pink markings on the lower lip, with a short tube, an ascending upper lip, and a downward-curving lower lip.

Stachys lamarckii flowers from August to September.

=== Identification ===
This species was at one time considered rare, possibly because it has often been confused with the highly variable Stachys aethiopica, which overlaps it in much of its geographic range. The key distinction between the two is the floral bracts, which in Stachys bolusii are longer than the corolla. In Stachys aethiopica, the bracts are shorter or equal to the calyx.

== Distribution and habitat ==
Stachys lamarckii is found among rocks in the greater Malmesbury area, and along the coast from Saldanha to the Cape Peninsula. Some sources extend the range to Stanford.

== Etymology ==
The species epithet honours the English-born South African botanist Harry Bolus (1834–1911). He started collecting plant specimens in Graaff-Reinet in 1865 and went on to organise six large-scale collecting expeditions in South Africa, Eswatini, and Mozambique between 1883 and 1904. His donation of his extensive private herbarium and library formed the basis of the Bolus Herbarium at the University of Cape Town. Plant genera named for him are Bolusia, Bolusafra, Neobolusia, Bolusanthus, and Bolusiella. Species include Leucospermum bolusii, Muraltia bolusii, Pleiospilos bolusii, and Serruria bolusii.

== See also ==
- List of Lamiaceae of South Africa
