= Muraltia minuta =

Scientific classification
- Kingdom: Plantae
- Clade: Embryophytes
- Clade: Tracheophytes
- Clade: Spermatophytes
- Clade: Angiosperms
- Clade: Eudicots
- Clade: Rosids
- Order: Fabales
- Family: Polygalaceae
- Genus: Muraltia
- Species: M. minuta

Binomial name
- Muraltia minuta Levyns

Species of flowering plant

Muraltia minuta (mini purple gorse) is a flowering plant in the milkwort family (Polygalaceae). It is endemic to rocky flats to about 100 metres (330 ft) above sea level in the south-western Cape Province, South Africa.

It is a perennial erect or spreading subshrub with a height between 6 and 20 centimetres (2.4 and 7.9 in) and branches mainly at its base. The plant's clustered leaves are softly-haired and have sharp tips. It produces pink flowers which are stalkless, the calyx is at least half the length of the corolla. It is categorised on the Red List of South African Plants as Endangered due to invasive species and habitat loss.

Muraltia minuta was first written about by Margaret Levyns in 1954 in the Journal of South African Botany. It was named "minuta", the Latin word for "small", in reference to the plant's small size.
