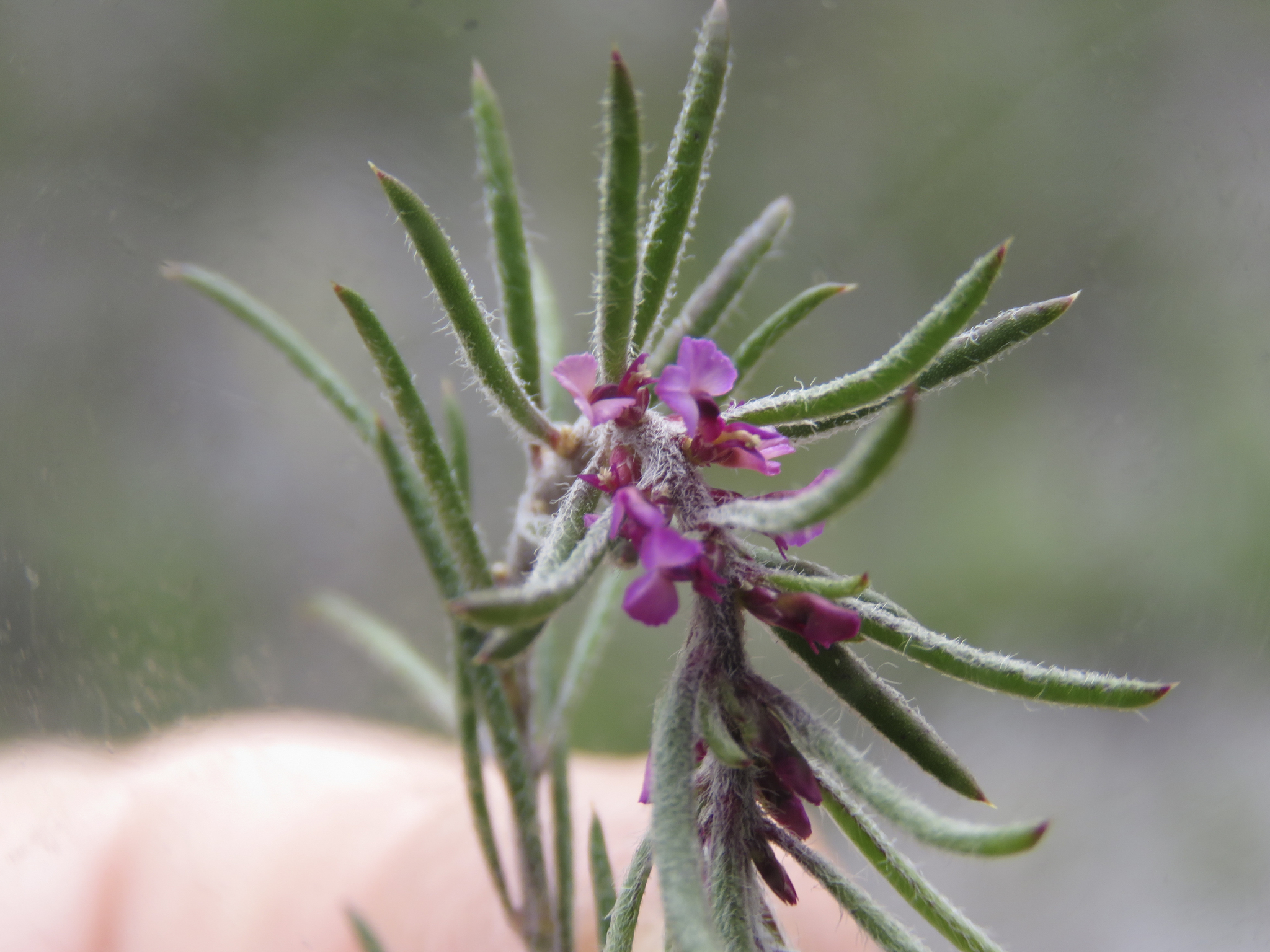
- Muraltia bolusii

Scientific classification
- Kingdom: Plantae
- Clade: Tracheophytes
- Clade: Angiosperms
- Clade: Eudicots
- Clade: Rosids
- Order: Fabales
- Family: Polygalaceae
- Tribe: Polygaleae
- Genus: Muraltia; DC. 1815

Type species
- Muraltia heisteria (L.) DC.

Synonyms
- Heisteria L. ex P. J. Bergius 1767, non Jacq. 1760; Mundia Kunth 1821 [1823]; Mundtia (Goldblatt & J.C. Manning) W. Harvey in W. Harvey & O. Sonder 1860, orth. var.; Nylandtia Dumort. 1822

= Muraltia =

Genus of flowering plants

Muraltia is a genus of plants in the milkwort family (Polygalaceae) which is native to Southern and Eastern Africa. Most of the species are endemic to South Africa, and one species is naturalized in Australia. It is named after Johannes von Muralt, a Swiss botanist and surgeon.

In 2006 the genus Nylandtia, which contained two species, was merged into Muraltia. The two species formerly part of Nylandtia are Muraltia scoparia and Muraltia spinosa. Nylandtia are commonly known as "Tortoise berry" plants ("skilpadbessie"). This is because of the bright edible berries that they produce, which are relished by the tortoise species of the fynbos.

== Description ==
Muraltia are perennial, ericoid shrublets or shrubs. Their small flowers and sessile or have short stalks. usually have 3 petals and 5 sepals which are usually subequal. Their fruits contain 2 seeds. Their capsules are flat, membranous, and usually 4-horned. Its seeds are pubescent.

== Species ==
As of November 2025, 119 species are accepted.

- Muraltia acerosa Harv.
- Muraltia acicularis Harv.
- Muraltia acipetala Harv.
- Muraltia aciphylla Levyns
- Muraltia alba Levyns
- Muraltia alopecuroides (L.) DC.
- Muraltia alticola Schltr.
- Muraltia angulosa Spreng. ex Turcz.
- Muraltia angustiflora Levyns
- Muraltia arachnoidea Chodat
- Muraltia aspalatha DC.
- Muraltia aspalathoides Schltr.
- Muraltia asparagifolia Eckl. & Zeyh.
- Muraltia barkerae Levyns
- Muraltia bolusii Levyns
- Muraltia bondii Vlok
- Muraltia brachyceras Schltr.
- Muraltia brachypetala Dod
- Muraltia caledonensis Levyns
- Muraltia calycina Harv.
- Muraltia capensis Levyns
- Muraltia carnosa E.Mey. ex Harv.
- Muraltia chamaepitys Chodat
- Muraltia ciliaris DC.
- Muraltia cliffortiifolia Eckl. & Zeyh.
- Muraltia collina Levyns
- Muraltia commutata Levyns
- Muraltia comptonii Levyns
- Muraltia concava Levyns
- Muraltia crassifolia Harv.
- Muraltia curvipetala Levyns
- Muraltia cuspifolia Chodat
- Muraltia cyclolopha Chodat
- Muraltia decipiens Schltr.
- Muraltia demissa Wolley-Dod
- Muraltia depressa Burch. ex DC.
- Muraltia diabolica Levyns
- Muraltia dispersa Levyns
- Muraltia divaricata Eckl. & Zeyh.
- Muraltia dumosa (Poir.) DC.
- Muraltia elsieae Paiva
- Muraltia empetroides Chodat
- Muraltia empleuridioides Schltr.
- Muraltia ericifolia DC.
- Muraltia ericoides (Burm.f.) Steud.
- Muraltia ferox Levyns
- Muraltia filiformis (Thunb.) DC.
- Muraltia flanaganii Bolus
- Muraltia gillettiae Levyns
- Muraltia guthriei Levyns
- Muraltia harveyana Levyns
- Muraltia heisteria (L.) DC.
- Muraltia hirsuta Levyns
- Muraltia horrida Diels
- Muraltia hyssopifolia Chodat
- Muraltia juniperifolia DC.
- Muraltia karroica Levyns
- Muraltia knysnaensis Levyns
- Muraltia lancifolia
- Muraltia langebergensis Levyns
- Muraltia leptorhiza Turcz.
- Muraltia lewisiae Levyns
- Muraltia lignosa Levyns
- Muraltia longicuspis Turcz.
- Muraltia macowanii Levyns
- Muraltia macrocarpa Lehm. ex Eckl. & Zeyh.
- Muraltia macroceras Burch. ex DC.
- Muraltia macropetala Harv.
- Muraltia minuta Leyvns
- Muraltia mitior (P.J.Bergius) Levyns ex Fourc.
- Muraltia mixta (L.f.) DC.
- Muraltia montana Levyns
- Muraltia muirii F.Bolus
- Muraltia muraltioides (Eckl. & Zeyh.) Levyns
- Muraltia mutabilis Levyns
- Muraltia namaquensis Levyns
- Muraltia obovata DC.
- Muraltia occidentalis Levyns
- Muraltia ononidifolia Eckl. & Zeyh.
- Muraltia orbicularis Hutch.
- Muraltia origanoides C.Presl
- Muraltia oxysepala Schltr.
- Muraltia pageae Levyns
- Muraltia paludosa Levyns
- Muraltia pappeana Harv.
- Muraltia parvifolia N.E.Br.
- Muraltia pauciflora (Thunb.) DC.
- Muraltia pillansii Levyns
- Muraltia plumosa Chodat
- Muraltia polyphylla (DC.) Levyns
- Muraltia pottebergensis Levyns
- Muraltia pubescens DC.
- Muraltia pungens Schltr.
- Muraltia rara Levyns
- Muraltia rhamnoides Chodat
- Muraltia rigida (DC.) Levyns
- Muraltia rosmarinifolia Levyns
- Muraltia rubeacea Eckl. & Zeyh.
- Muraltia salsolacea Chodat
- Muraltia satureioides Burch. ex DC.
- Muraltia saxicola Chodat
- Muraltia schlechteri Levyns
- Muraltia scoparia (Eckl. & Zeyh.) Levyns
- Muraltia serpylloides DC.
- Muraltia serrata Levyns
- Muraltia spicata Bolus
- Muraltia spinosa (L.) F.Forest & J.C.Manning
- Muraltia splendens Levyns
- Muraltia squarrosa DC.
- Muraltia stenophylla Levyns
- Muraltia stipulacea (Burm.f.) Burch. ex DC.
- Muraltia stokoei Levyns
- Muraltia striata (Thunb.) DC.
- Muraltia tenuifolia DC.
- Muraltia thunbergii Eckl. & Zeyh.
- Muraltia thymifolia (Thunb.) DC.
- Muraltia trinervia (L.f.) DC.
- Muraltia vulnerans Levyns
- Muraltia vulpina Chodat
