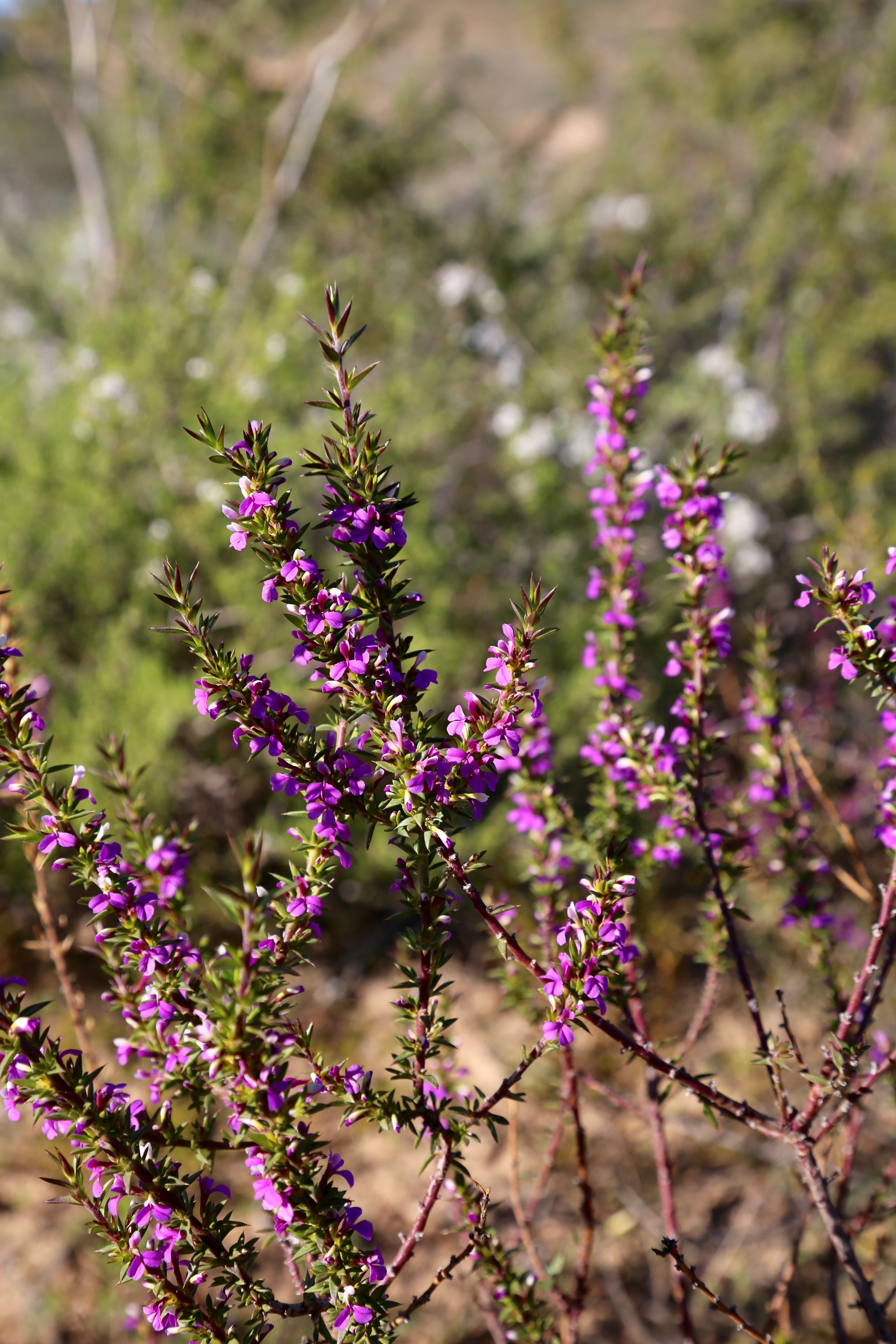

Conservation status
- Least Concern (SANBI Red List)

Scientific classification
- Kingdom: Plantae
- Clade: Embryophytes
- Clade: Tracheophytes
- Clade: Spermatophytes
- Clade: Angiosperms
- Clade: Eudicots
- Clade: Rosids
- Order: Fabales
- Family: Polygalaceae
- Genus: Muraltia
- Species: M. heisteria

Binomial name
- Muraltia heisteria (L.) DC.

Synonyms
- Heisteria pungens P.J.Bergius; Muraltia albietina Chodat; Polygala heisteria L.; Polygala stipulacea Burm.f.

= Muraltia heisteria =

Species of flowering plant

Muraltia heisteria is a shrub that is part of the Muraltia genus in the milkwort family (Polygalaceae). It is native to South Africa and is an emerging invasive species in South Australia. It was first described in 1753 by Carl Linnaeus.

== Description ==
It is a very prickly, erect, sparsely-branched perennial shrub or dwarf shrub which is very rigid and densely branched. It has a height between 20 and 80 centimetres (0.66 and 2.62 ft). It contains hard, thick, spine-tipped, lance-shaped leaves which usually have hairy edges. They are clustered along the stem and are 5 to 10 millimetres (0.20 to 0.39 in) long and 1 to 2 millimetres (0.039 to 0.079 in) wide.

It produces small purple, pink, or occasionally white flowers which are thickly studded along the branches and 7 to 12 millimetres (0.28 to 0.47 in) long. Its 5 sepals are 4 to 5 millimetres (0.16 to 0.20 in) long and almost equal in length while its 3 petals are 8 to 10 millimetres (0.31 to 0.39 in) long.

== Taxonomy ==
It was first described by Carl Linnaeus as part of the Polygala genus in 1753. It was reclassified as a Muraltia in the 1760s. It is named after Lorenz Heister, a German surgeon and botanist.

== Habitat and ecology ==
It is native to lower rocky mountain slopes with altitudes between 5 and 1,705 metres (16 and 5,594 ft) in Eastern Cape, Northern Cape, and Western Cape and has been introduced to South Australia, New South Wales, and Victoria. The plant has been shown to naturally self-pollinate. It flowers between October and December in native areas, and between June and November in Australia. It serves as the host plant of the insect Pseudococcus muraltiae. According to the Red List of South African Plants, it is of least ecological concern and its population is stable.

== Uses ==
The flowering twigs of the plant are used as an appetite stimulant in the local area and the plant is cultivated in Australia.
