= Stachys lallaniana =

Conservation status
- Least Concern (SANBI Red List)

Scientific classification
- Kingdom: Plantae
- Clade: Tracheophytes
- Clade: Angiosperms
- Clade: Eudicots
- Clade: Asterids
- Order: Lamiales
- Family: Lamiaceae
- Genus: Stachys
- Species: S. lallaniana

Binomial name
- Stachys lallaniana R.Kr.Singh & Sanjeet Kumar

Synonyms
- Stachys malacophylla Skan

Species of shrub

Stachys lallaniana, the Komani woundwort, is a species of hedgenettle endemic to South Africa′s Eastern Cape province.

It was previously named Stachys malacophylla Skan – an illegitimate homonym of the earlier Stachys malacophylla Greene (now Stachys albens, a Californian species) – so it was renamed in 2024.

== Description ==
This species is a perennial herb with spreading stems that lie along the ground, branch sparingly, and grow up to 40 cm (16 in) long. The stems are fairly densely covered with soft hairs.

The leaves are borne on short stalks and have fairly firm, broadly ovate blades, 14–30 mm (0.55–1.18 in) long. They are greyish and the same colour on both surfaces, with the upper surface covered in fine, pressed hairs and the underside densely velvety. The leaves have a rounded tip, a deeply heart-shaped base, and shallowly scalloped margins.

The flowers are arranged in a loose inflorescence of two to eight whorls, each bearing four to six flowers, occasionally two or three. The bracts are reduced, with the upper ones narrow and shorter than the calyx, which is densely hairy and finely gland-dotted.

The corolla is mauve, with a short tube and a two-lipped form, the upper lip held horizontally.

Stachys lallaniana flowers from November to April.

=== Identification ===
Stachys lallaniana is closely related to Stachys sessilifolia but has petiolate leaves and mostly 4–6-flowered whorls.

== Distribution and habitat ==
Stachys lallaniana grows on grassy mountain slopes and summits and in riverine mountain forest at altitudes of 610–1,950 m (2,000–6,400 ft). It′s found in an area south of Qacha′s Neck at the border with Lesotho and, separately, from Dordrecht through Komani to Katberg and on to Qonce.

== See also ==
- List of Lamiaceae of South Africa
