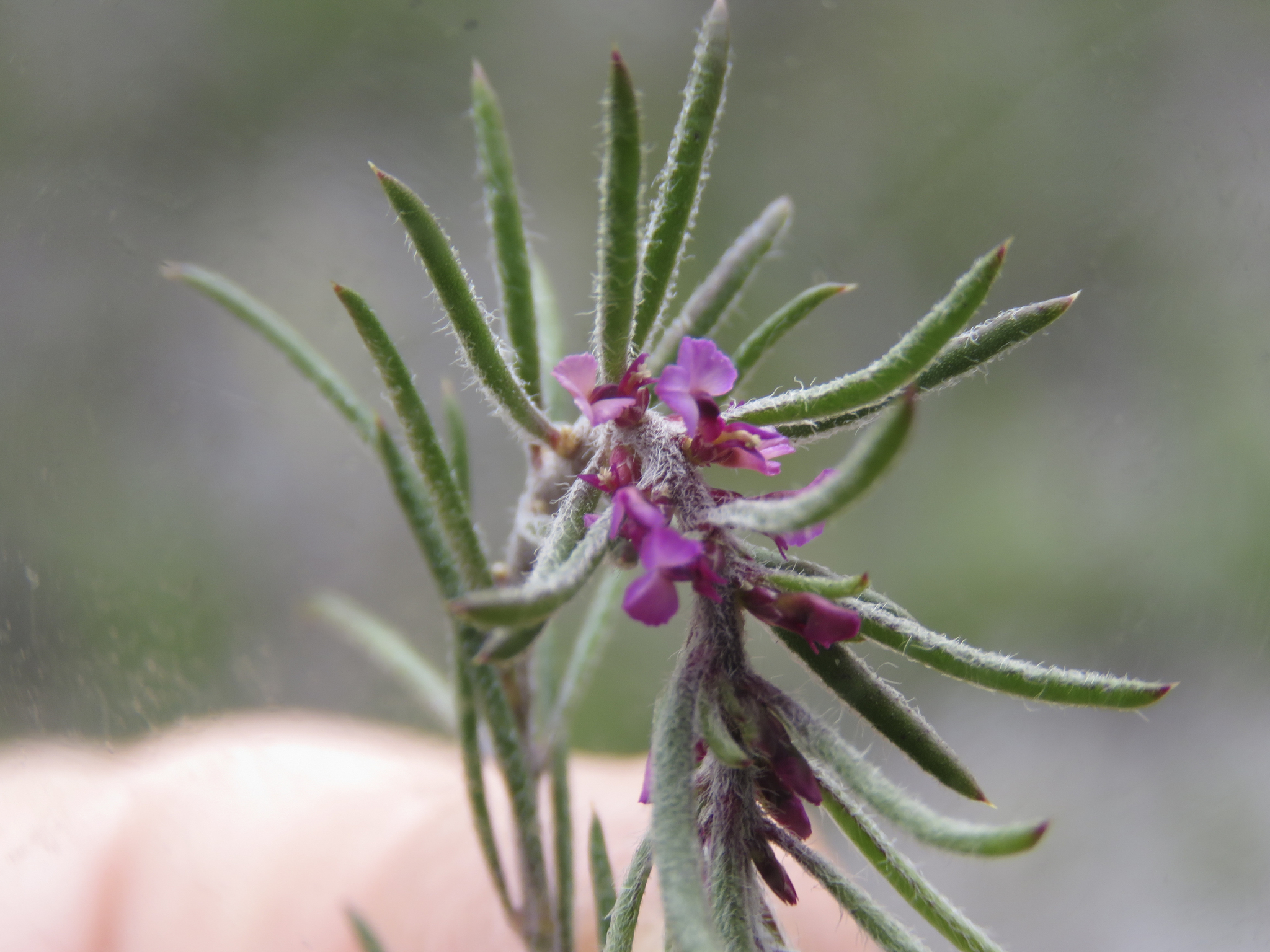

Conservation status
- Endangered (SANBI Red List)

Scientific classification
- Kingdom: Plantae
- Clade: Embryophytes
- Clade: Tracheophytes
- Clade: Spermatophytes
- Clade: Angiosperms
- Clade: Eudicots
- Clade: Rosids
- Order: Fabales
- Family: Polygalaceae
- Genus: Muraltia
- Species: M. bolusii

Binomial name
- Muraltia bolusii Levyns

= Muraltia bolusii =

Species of flowering plant

Muraltia bolusii is a plant species in the milkwort family (Polygalaceae). It is endemic to sandy coastal flatland with altitudes below 500 metres (1,600 ft) in Western Cape, South Africa. It was first described in 1954 by Margaret Levyns in the Journal of South African Botany. The Red List of South African Plants has listed it as endangered since 2007 due to habitat loss caused by nearby urban expansion, crop cultivation, and sand mining, as well as invasive species. Its population is decreasing.

== Description ==
It is a perennial erect or spreading shrublet with a height up to 20 centimetres (7.9 in). It branches mainly from its base. Its leaves are stalkless and mostly bundled with a pointed tip. Its flowers are pink, stalkless, and 3.3 to 4 millimetres (0.13 to 0.16 in) long. It flowers between September and January.
