= Bolusiella iridifolia =

Scientific classification
- Kingdom: Plantae
- Clade: Tracheophytes
- Clade: Angiosperms
- Clade: Monocots
- Order: Asparagales
- Family: Orchidaceae
- Subfamily: Epidendroideae
- Genus: Bolusiella
- Species: B. iridifolia

Binomial name
- Bolusiella iridifolia (Rolfe) Schltr.

Synonyms
- Listrostachys iridifolia Rolfe

Species of orchid

Bolusiella iridifolia is a species of flowering plant in the family Orchidaceae. It is widespread across much of tropical and southern Africa, as well as the Comoro Islands in the Indian Ocean.

Bolusiella iridifolia grows in a cold windy humid environment at high altitudes. The species has succulent leaves that form a fan shape. The inflorescence is periodically covered in brown bracts from which protrude tiny white spurred flowers.

== Subspecies ==
Two subspecies are recognized:

- Bolusiella iridifolia subsp. iridifolia - from Ivory Coast east to Ethiopia and Tanzania, south to Angola and Zimbabwe; also Comoros
- Bolusiella iridifolia subsp. picea P.J.Cribb - from Burundi and Kenya south to Zimbabwe
