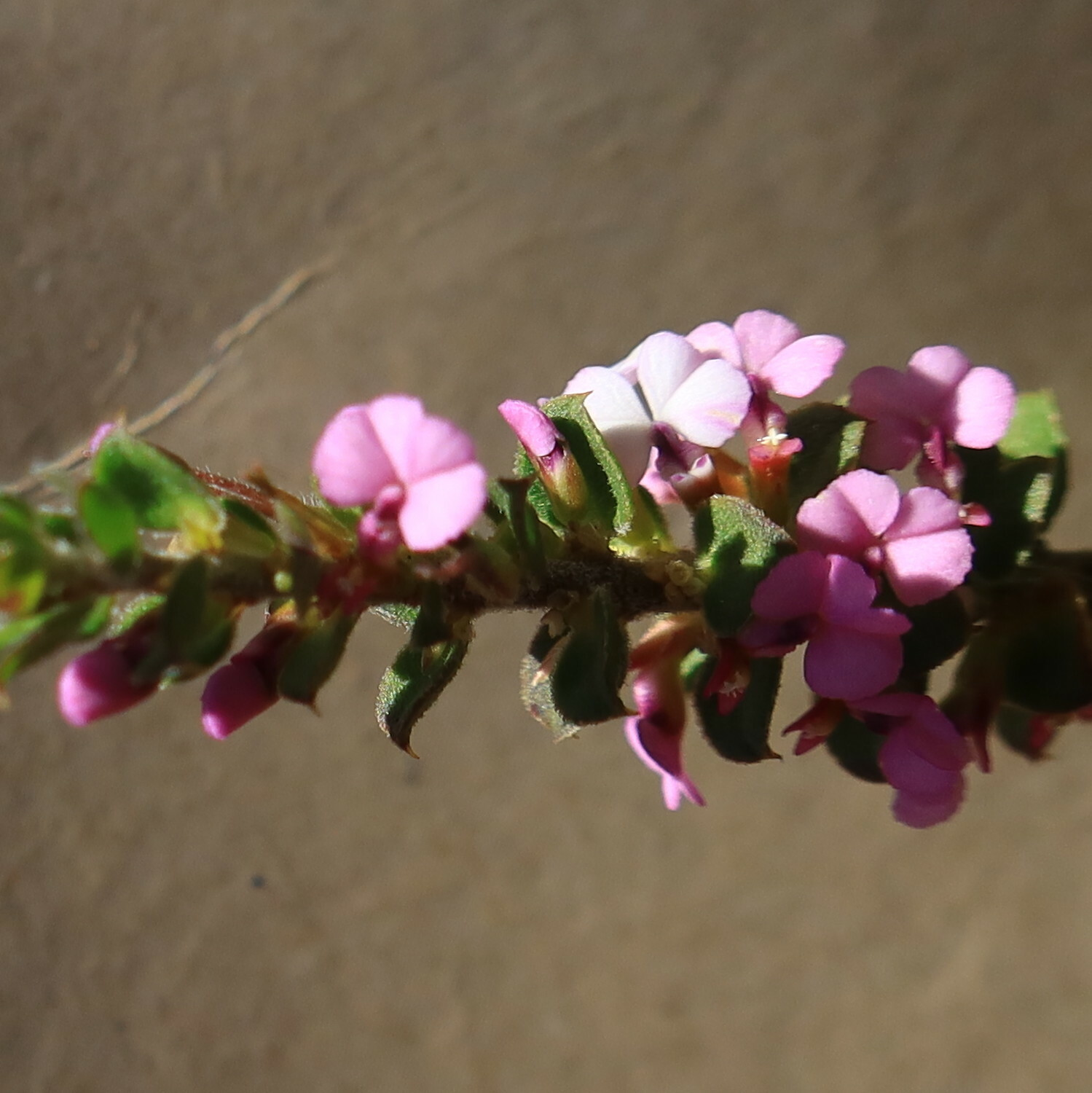

Scientific classification
- Kingdom: Plantae
- Clade: Tracheophytes
- Clade: Angiosperms
- Clade: Eudicots
- Clade: Rosids
- Order: Fabales
- Family: Polygalaceae
- Genus: Muraltia
- Species: M. orbicularis

Binomial name
- Muraltia orbicularis Hutch.

= Muraltia orbicularis =

Species of plant

Muraltia orbicularis is a species of flowering plant from the family Polygalaceae. The species is endemic to Cape Peninsula in South Africa.
