= Muraltia flanaganii =

Scientific classification
- Kingdom: Plantae
- Clade: Embryophytes
- Clade: Tracheophytes
- Clade: Spermatophytes
- Clade: Angiosperms
- Clade: Eudicots
- Clade: Rosids
- Order: Fabales
- Family: Polygalaceae
- Genus: Muraltia
- Species: M. flanaganii

Binomial name
- Muraltia flanaganii Bolus

Species of flowering plant

Muraltia flanaganii is a plant species in the milkwort family (Polygalaceae). It is native to grasslands and moorlands with altitudes between 1,160 and 3,355 metres (3,806 and 11,007 ft) in southern and eastern Africa. It is a perennial shrub with a height of 20 to 100 centimetres (0.66 to 3.28 ft) which produces white, pink, or purple flowers. Its leaves are 3 to 8 millimetres (0.12 to 0.31 in) long, 0.5 to 1 millimetre (0.020 to 0.039 in) wide, and obtuse or apiculate, ending at a needle-like point. The surface of the leaves are glabrous and rough to the touch. According to the Red List of South African Plants, the species is of least ecological concern. It was first described in the Journal of Botany, British and Foreign by Harry Bolus.
