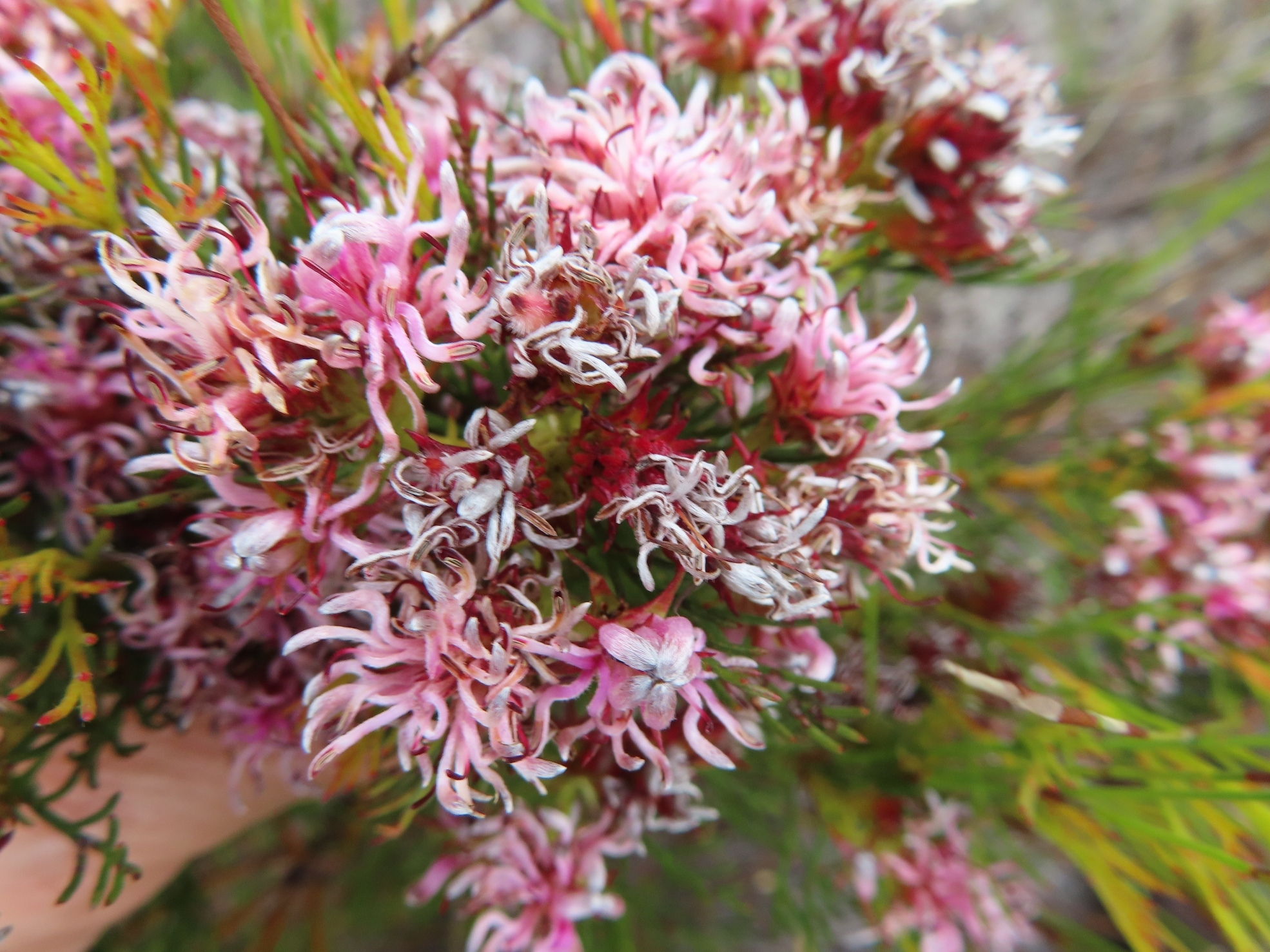

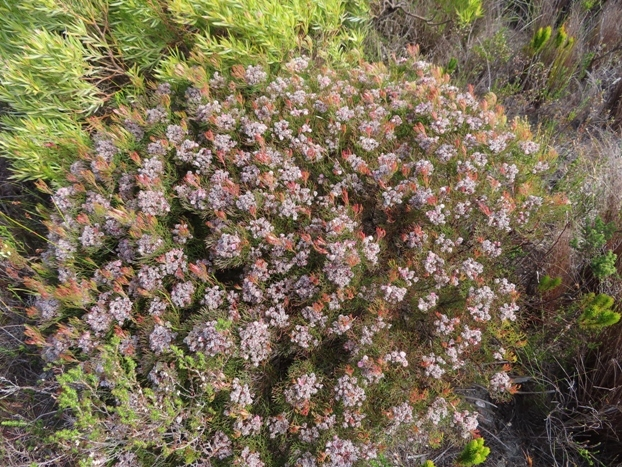

Conservation status
- Near Threatened (IUCN 3.1)

Scientific classification
- Kingdom: Plantae
- Clade: Tracheophytes
- Clade: Angiosperms
- Clade: Eudicots
- Order: Proteales
- Family: Proteaceae
- Genus: Serruria
- Species: S. bolusii

Binomial name
- Serruria bolusii E.Phillips & Hutch.

= Serruria bolusii =

Species of plant

Serruria bolusii, the Agulhas spiderhead, is a flower-bearing shrub that belongs to the family Proteaceae. It is part of the South African fynbos vegetation type. The plant is native to the Western Cape and is found in Elim hills and Soetanysberg. The shrub grows upright to 1.0 m tall and flowers from August to December.

The plant dies after a fire but the seeds survive. Two months after flowering, the fruit falls off. The plant is unisexual. Pollination takes place through the action of insects. The plant grows in sandy soil at altitudes of 20 – 580 m.

In Afrikaans it is known as agulhas-spinnekopbos.
