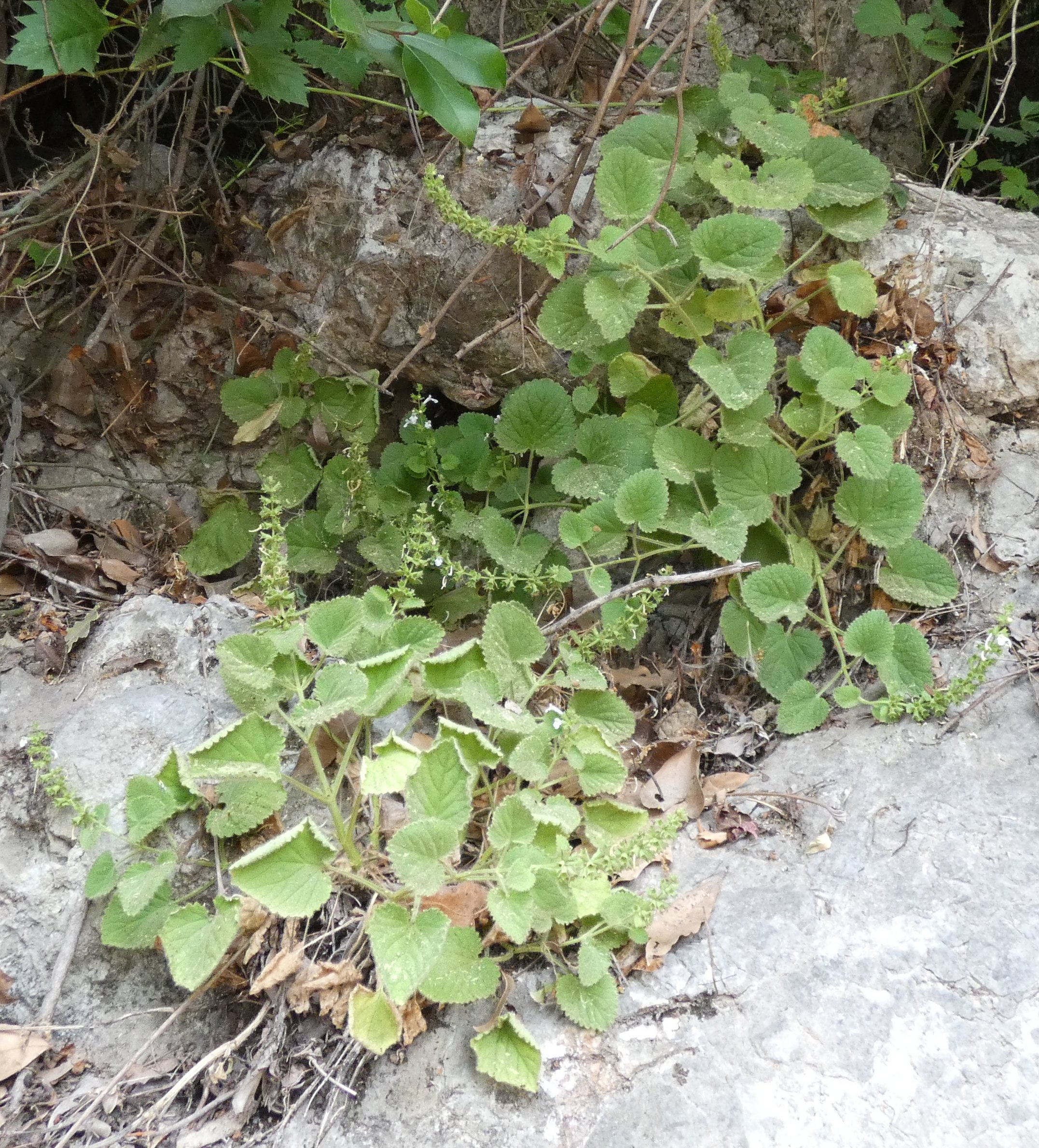

Scientific classification
- Kingdom: Plantae
- Clade: Embryophytes
- Clade: Tracheophytes
- Clade: Angiosperms
- Clade: Eudicots
- Clade: Asterids
- Order: Lamiales
- Family: Lamiaceae
- Genus: Stachys
- Species: S. antalyensis

Binomial name
- Stachys antalyensis Ayaşlıgil & P.H.Davis

= Stachys antalyensis =

Species of flowering plant

Stachys antalyensis is a species of flowering plant in the family Lamiaceae endemic to the Antalya region of Turkey.

== Description ==
Stachys antalyensis is a perennial herb with fragile stems growing on calcareous rocks in Antalya with an altitude of 400–800 m (1,300–2,600 ft).

It is a hairy plant, with moderate to large (to 7 cm), oval, broad-toothed leaves, and with whorls of white flowers set densely along shortish (to c.8 cm), straight flowering stems orientated upwards, with generally 6-10 flowers per whorl, a combination distinguishing it from similar species which generally have fewer flowers per whorl, much longer flowering stems regularly drooping downwards, or flowers that are pinkish. The flower tube has a ring of hairs within.

As a regional-endemic known from a limited number of places, it is classed as VU (Vulnerable).

Photographic details can be seen on iNaturalist.

== Photographic description ==
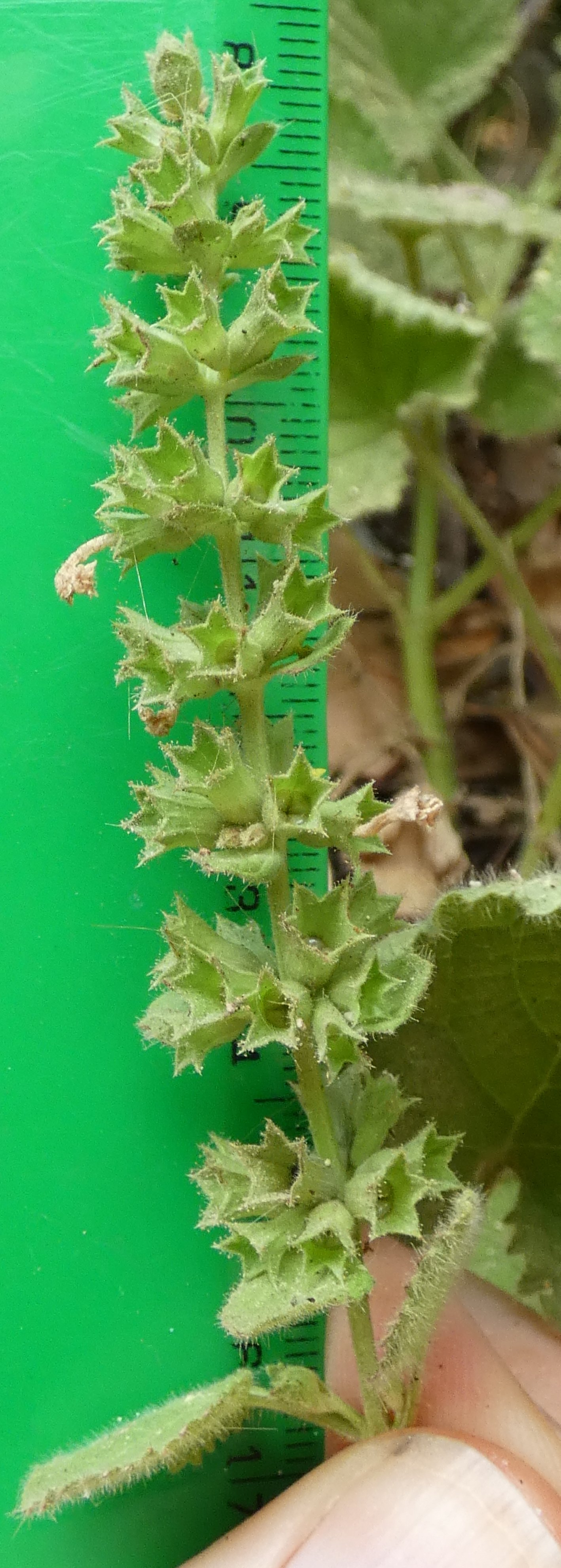
Inflorescence shortish, straight, upright, with dense whorls of many flowers

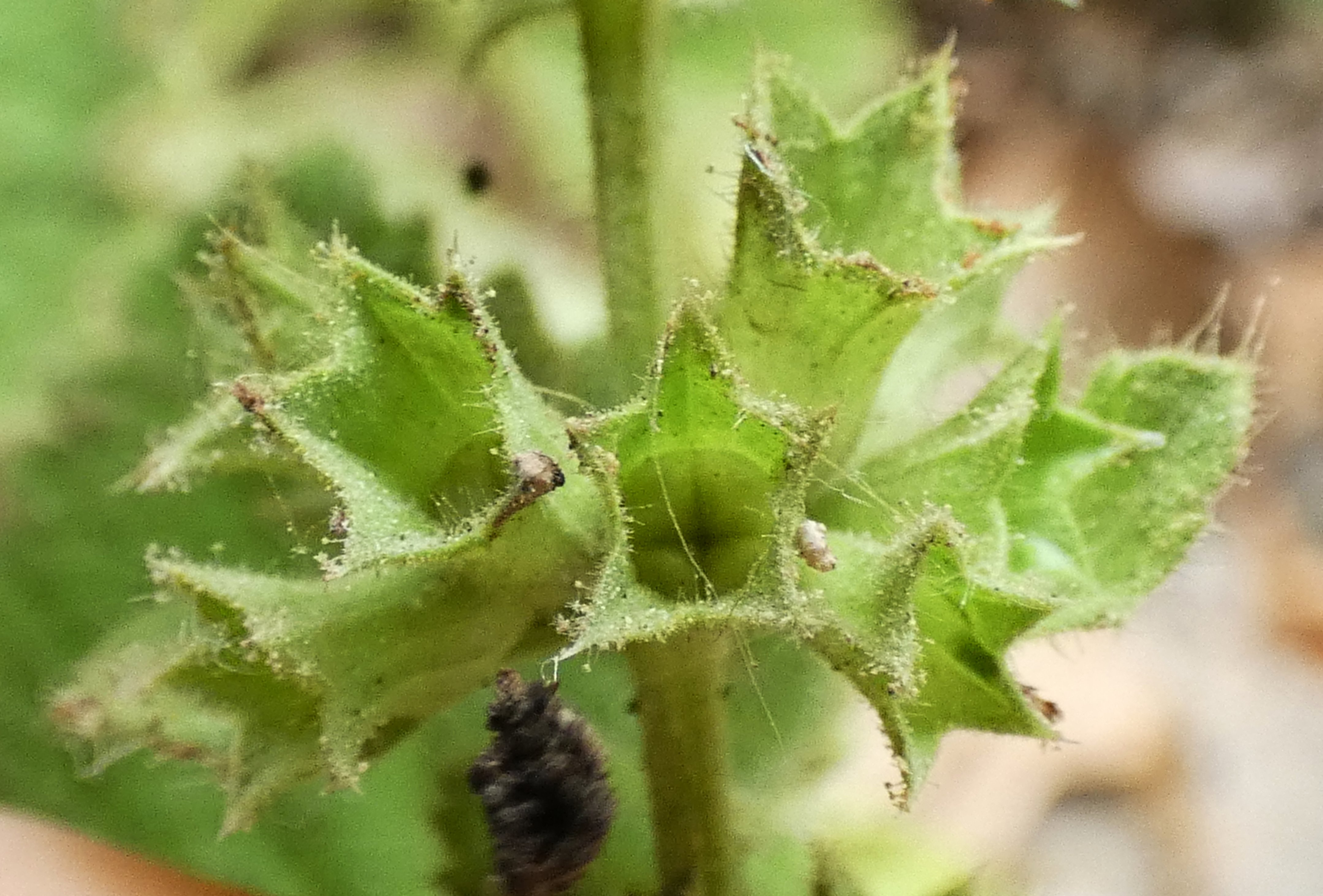
Whorl of calyxes

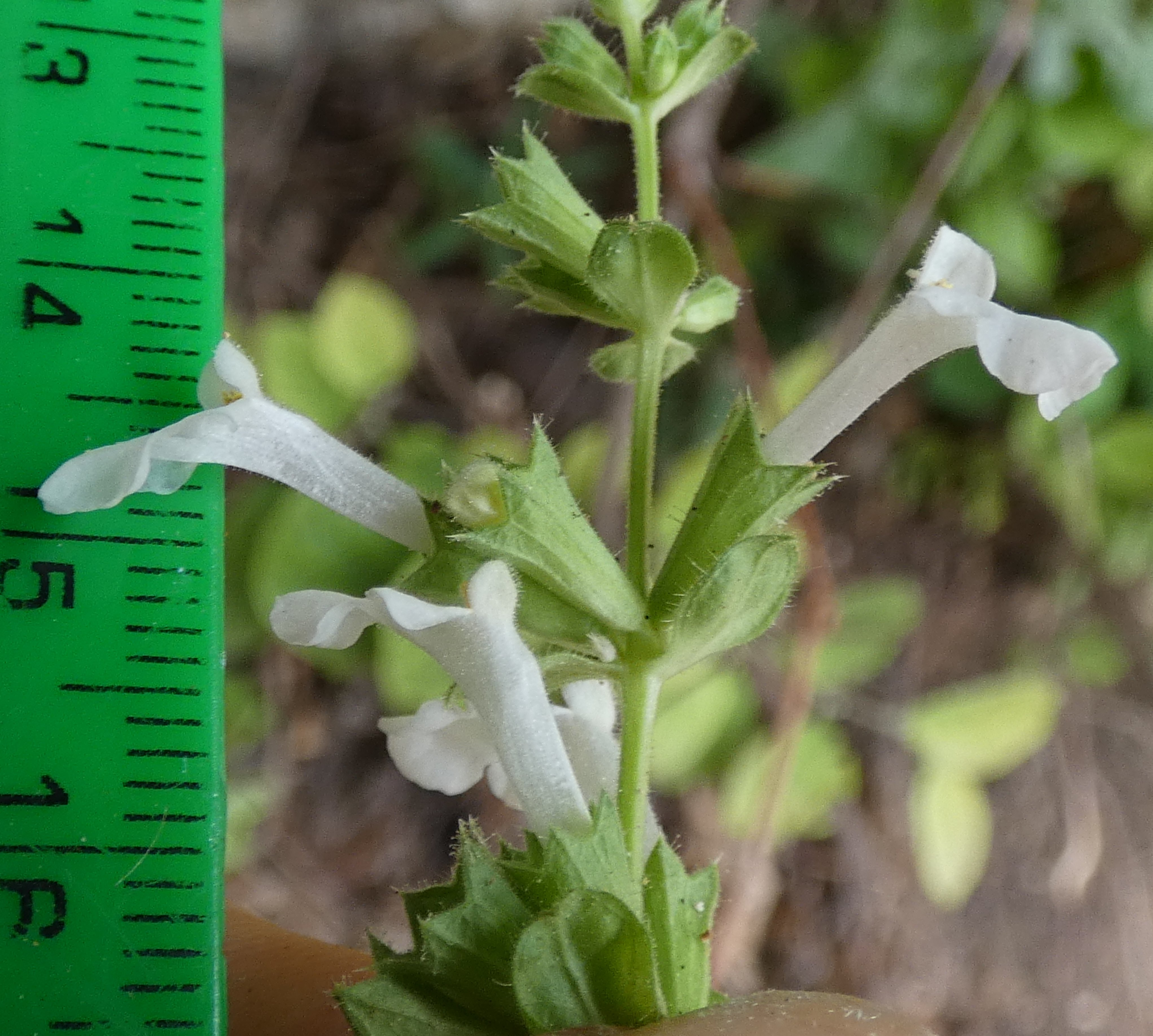
Flowers (near tip)

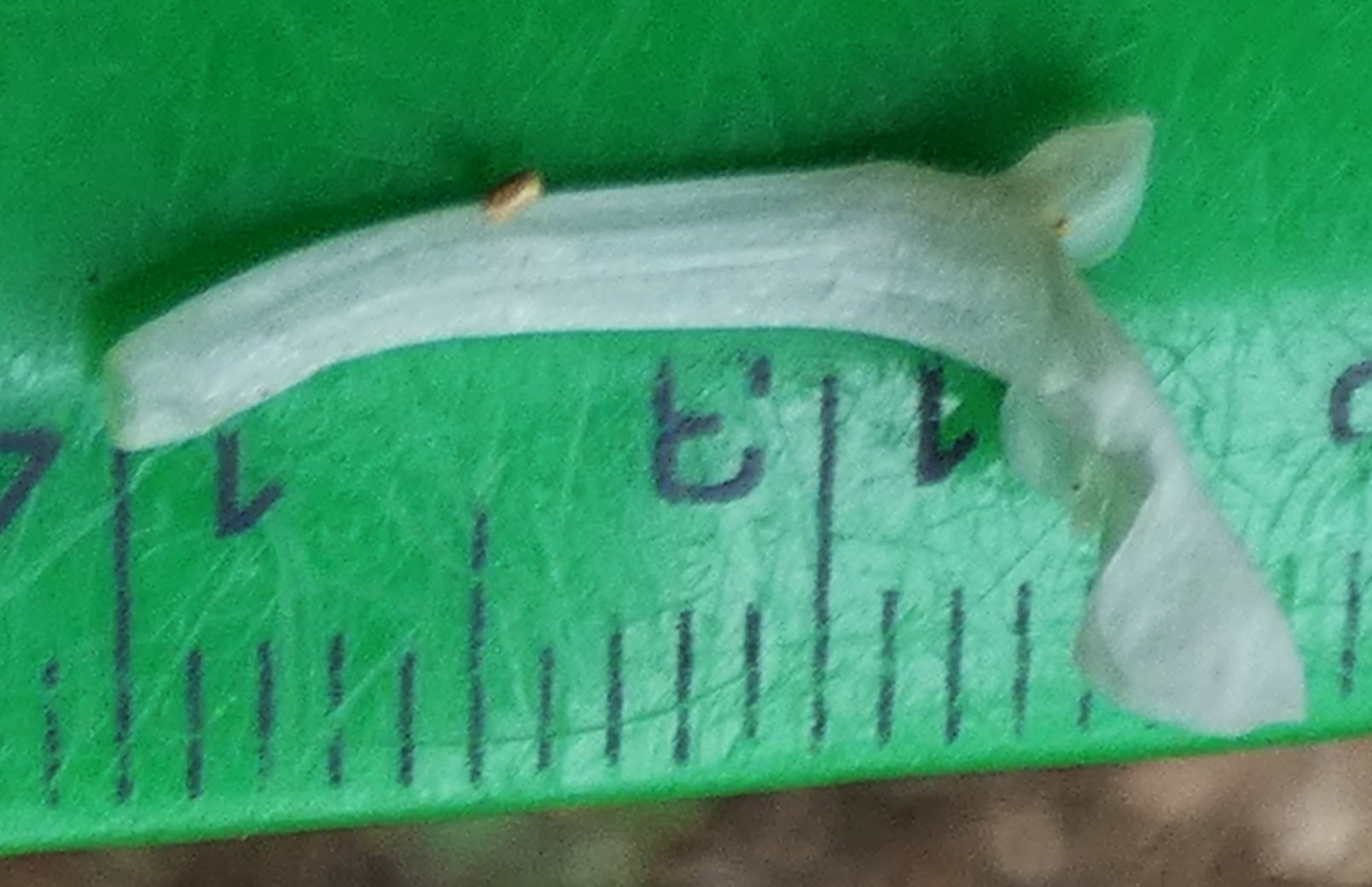
Corolla

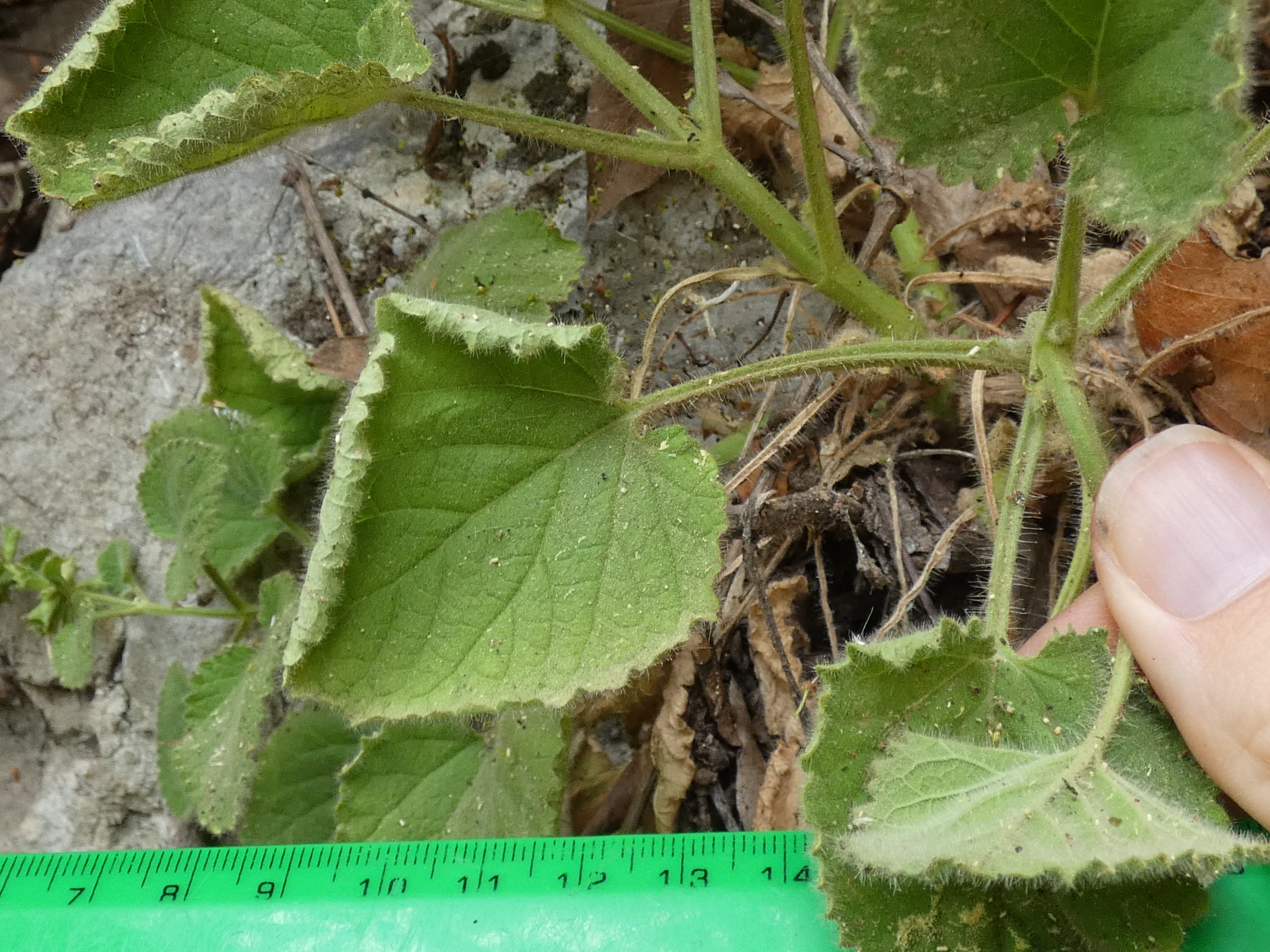
Leaves and stalks from above

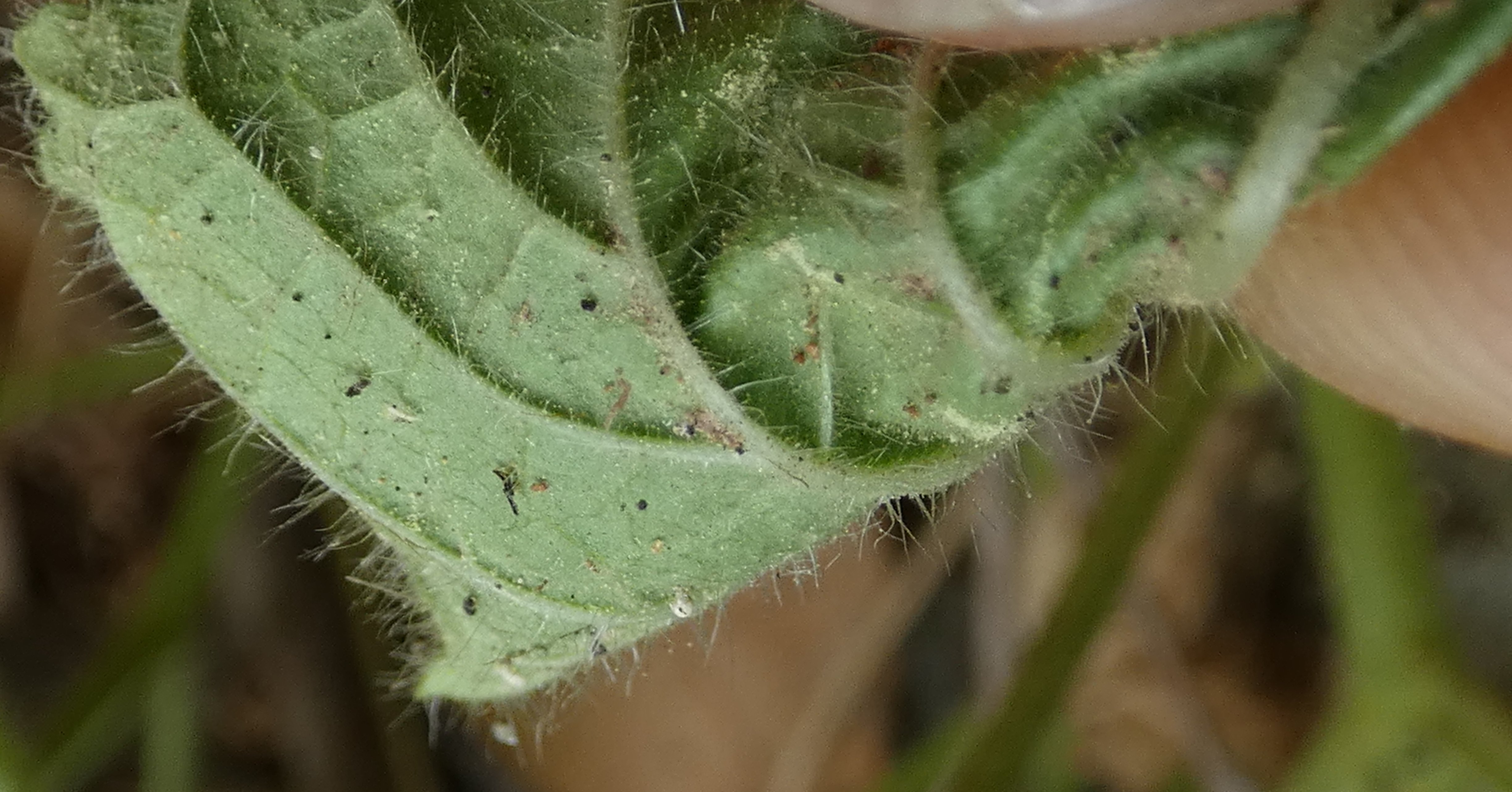
Hairs under leaf
