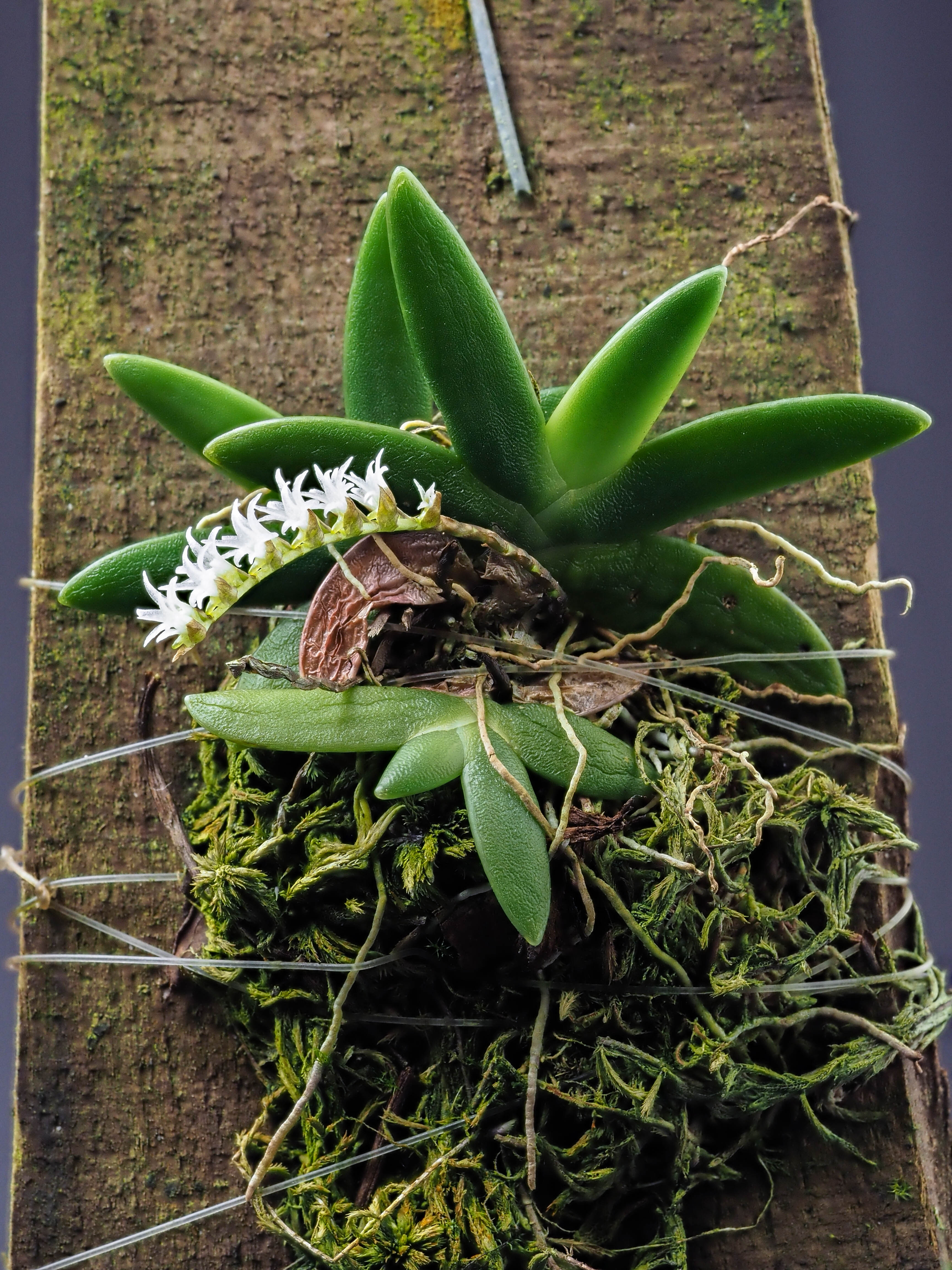
- Bolusiella maudiae

Scientific classification
- Kingdom: Plantae
- Clade: Tracheophytes
- Clade: Angiosperms
- Clade: Monocots
- Order: Asparagales
- Family: Orchidaceae
- Subfamily: Epidendroideae
- Tribe: Vandeae
- Subtribe: Angraecinae
- Genus: Bolusiella; Schltr.

Type species
- Bolusiella maudiae (Bolus) Schltr.

= Bolusiella =

Genus of orchids

Bolusiella is a genus of flowering plants from the orchid family, Orchidaceae. It consists of 4 currently recognized species that are endemic to sub-Saharan Africa and the Comoro Islands.

Bolusiella are often very small, no more than a few centimeters tall. They exhibit monopodial growth.

== Species and subspecies ==
The following are accepted as of May 2014:

- Bolusiella fractiflexa Droissart, Stévart & Verlynde - Cameroon, Rwanda to Burundi
- Bolusiella iridifolia (Rolfe) Schltr.
  - Bolusiella iridifolia subsp. iridifolia - from Ivory Coast east to Ethiopia and Tanzania, south to Angola and Zimbabwe; also Comoros
  - Bolusiella iridifolia subsp. picea P.J.Cribb - from Burundi and Kenya south to Zimbabwe
- Bolusiella maudiae (Bolus) Schltr. - from Ivory Coast east to Tanzania, south to KwaZulu-Natal
- Bolusiella talbotii (Rendle) Summerh. in J.Hutchinson & J.M.Dalziel - from Sierra Leone to Tanzania
- Bolusiella zenkeri (Kraenzl.) Schltr. - from Ivory Coast east to Gabon

== See also ==
- List of Orchidaceae genera
