= Stachys hyssopoides =

Conservation status
- Least Concern (SANBI Red List)

Scientific classification
- Kingdom: Plantae
- Clade: Tracheophytes
- Clade: Angiosperms
- Clade: Eudicots
- Clade: Asterids
- Order: Lamiales
- Family: Lamiaceae
- Genus: Stachys
- Species: S. hyssopoides

Binomial name
- Stachys hyssopoides Burch. ex Benth.

Synonyms
- Stachys coerulea Burch. ex Benth.; Stachys macilenta E.Mey.

Species of flowering plant

Stachys hyssopoides is a species of hedgenettle present in Lesotho and South Africa, where it can be found in every province other than the Western Cape.

== Description ==
This species is a perennial herb, growing 20–60 cm (7.9–23.6 in) tall, with stems that are erect or sometimes spreading along the ground. It has a creeping underground rootstock, and produces annual stems that are simple or only sparsely branched. The stems range from smooth to softly covered with fine, star-shaped hairs.

The leaves are narrow, leathery, and almost stalkless, sometimes clustered along the stem. They are linear to lanceolate, 20–55 mm (0.8–2.2 in) long, with smooth margins and a blunt or slightly pointed tip. The leaf bases taper or partly clasp the stem, and the surfaces are smooth to lightly hairy.

The flowers are borne in a series of spaced whorls along the stem, each with two to six flowers. They are pink, mauve, or purple, often marked with darker flecks. The calyx is grey and softly hairy, and the corolla has a short tube with two lips, the lower lip slightly curved downward.

Stachys hyssopoides flowers from November to April.

=== Identification ===
It is related to S. dregeana but can be fairly easily distinguished from it by its leaves, which are narrower, firmer, and smoother.

== Distribution and habitat ==
S. hyssopoides grows alongside rivers and streams or in depressions across a large portion of central South Africa, as well as Lesotho, at 685–1,800 m (2,247–5,906 ft) in altitude. It prefers black clay or heavy loam soil.

== See also ==
- List of Lamiaceae of South Africa
