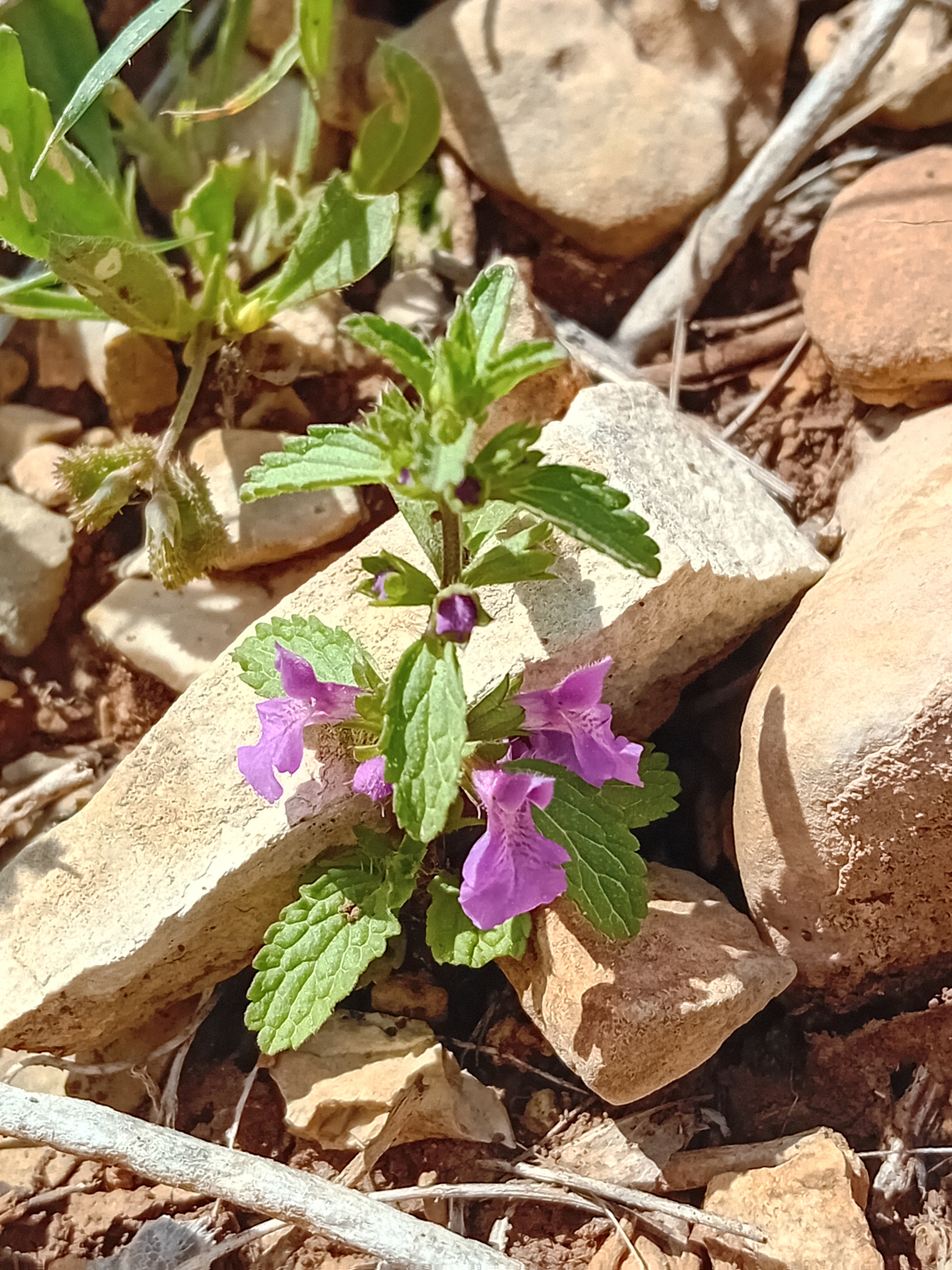

Scientific classification
- Kingdom: Plantae
- Clade: Tracheophytes
- Clade: Angiosperms
- Clade: Eudicots
- Clade: Asterids
- Order: Lamiales
- Family: Lamiaceae
- Genus: Stachys
- Species: S. neurocalycina

Binomial name
- Stachys neurocalycina Boiss.

= Stachys neurocalycina =

Species of flowering plant

Stachys neurocalycina is a plant in the family Lamiaceae.

== Description ==
It is an annual plant, having serrate or dentate leaves that are smooth or slightly pubescent. The plant yields crimson flowers from February to May.

== Habitat ==
The plant is endemic to garrigue of Israel.
