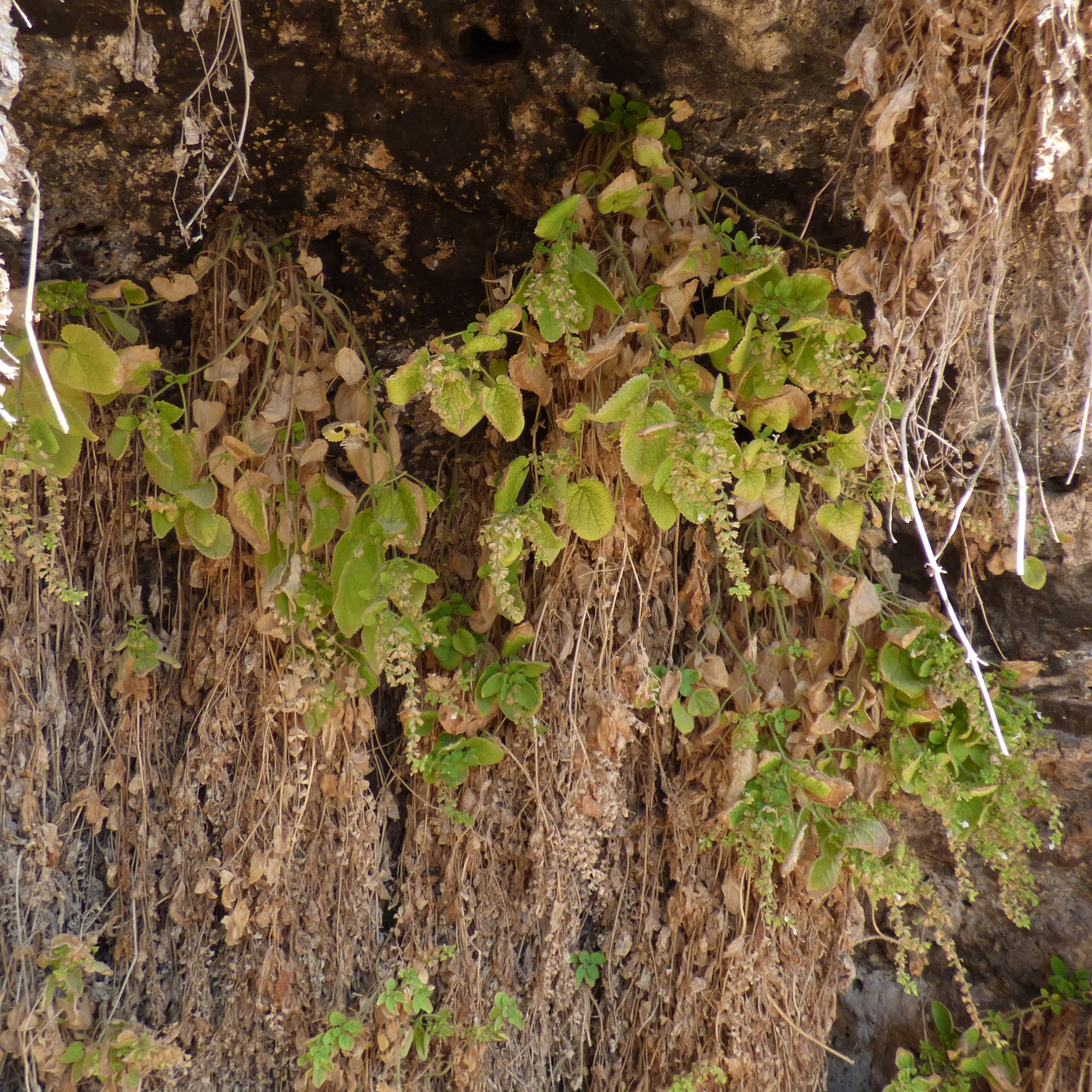

Scientific classification
- Kingdom: Plantae
- Clade: Embryophytes
- Clade: Tracheophytes
- Clade: Angiosperms
- Clade: Eudicots
- Clade: Asterids
- Order: Lamiales
- Family: Lamiaceae
- Genus: Stachys
- Species: S. pinardii

Binomial name
- Stachys pinardii Boiss.

= Stachys pinardii =

Species of flowering plant

Stachys pinardii is a species of flowering plant in the family Lamiaceae endemic to the Antalya region of Turkey.

== Description ==
Stachys pinardii is a perennial herb with fragile stems growing on the walls, roof and floor of calcareous caverns and vertical faces in Antalya with an altitude of 20–350 m (66–1,100 ft).

It is a long-hairy plant, with large, oval, broad-toothed leaves, and with medium-spaced (3(-6) cm apart) whorls of white flowers set along flowering stems that from the limestone walls and roofs tend to hang downwards. There are generally 4–10 flowers per whorl, distinguishing it from the similar Stachys buttleri of the Upper Düden Waterfalls which generally has 2 per whorl. Rather eastward at Içel there is a similar Stachys pseudopinardii with laxer whorls (1–9.5 cm apart) which lacks the hair-ring within the flower tube that S. pinardii possesses and has larger nutlets (3–3.5 mm) than S. pinardii (2.5 mm)

As a regional-endemic known from a limited number of places, it is classed as VU (Vulnerable).

Photographic details can be seen on iNaturalist.

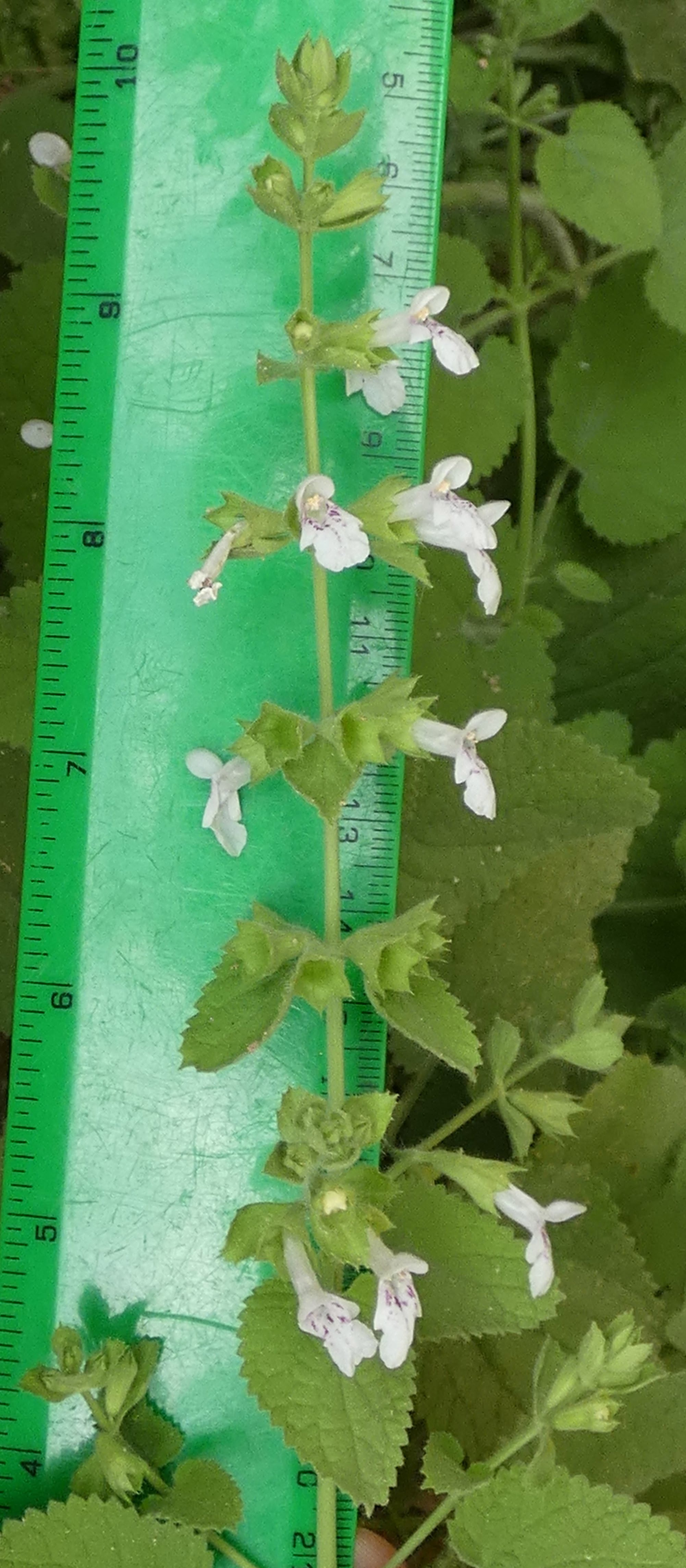
Inflorescence, 4–10 flowered

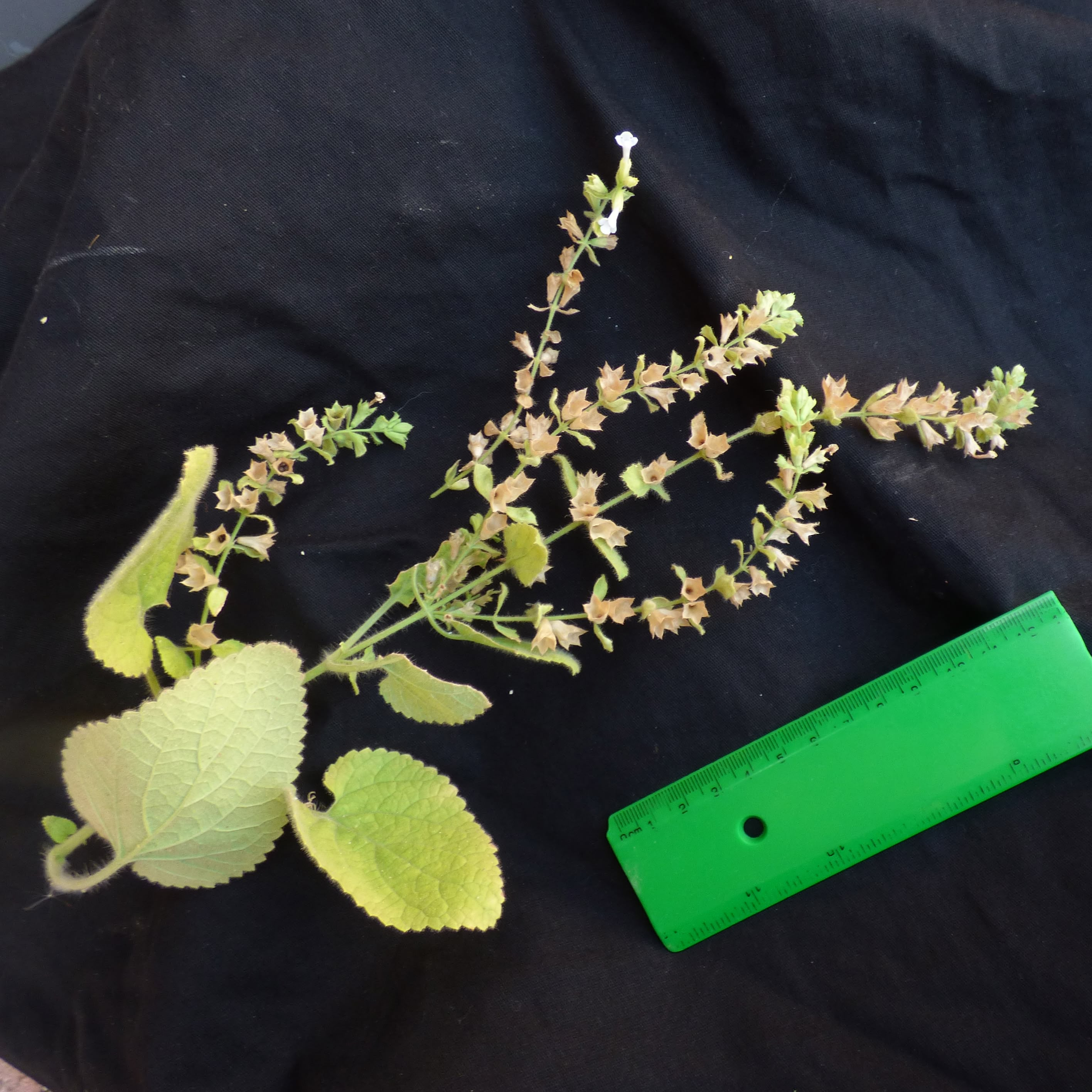
Upper flowering parts

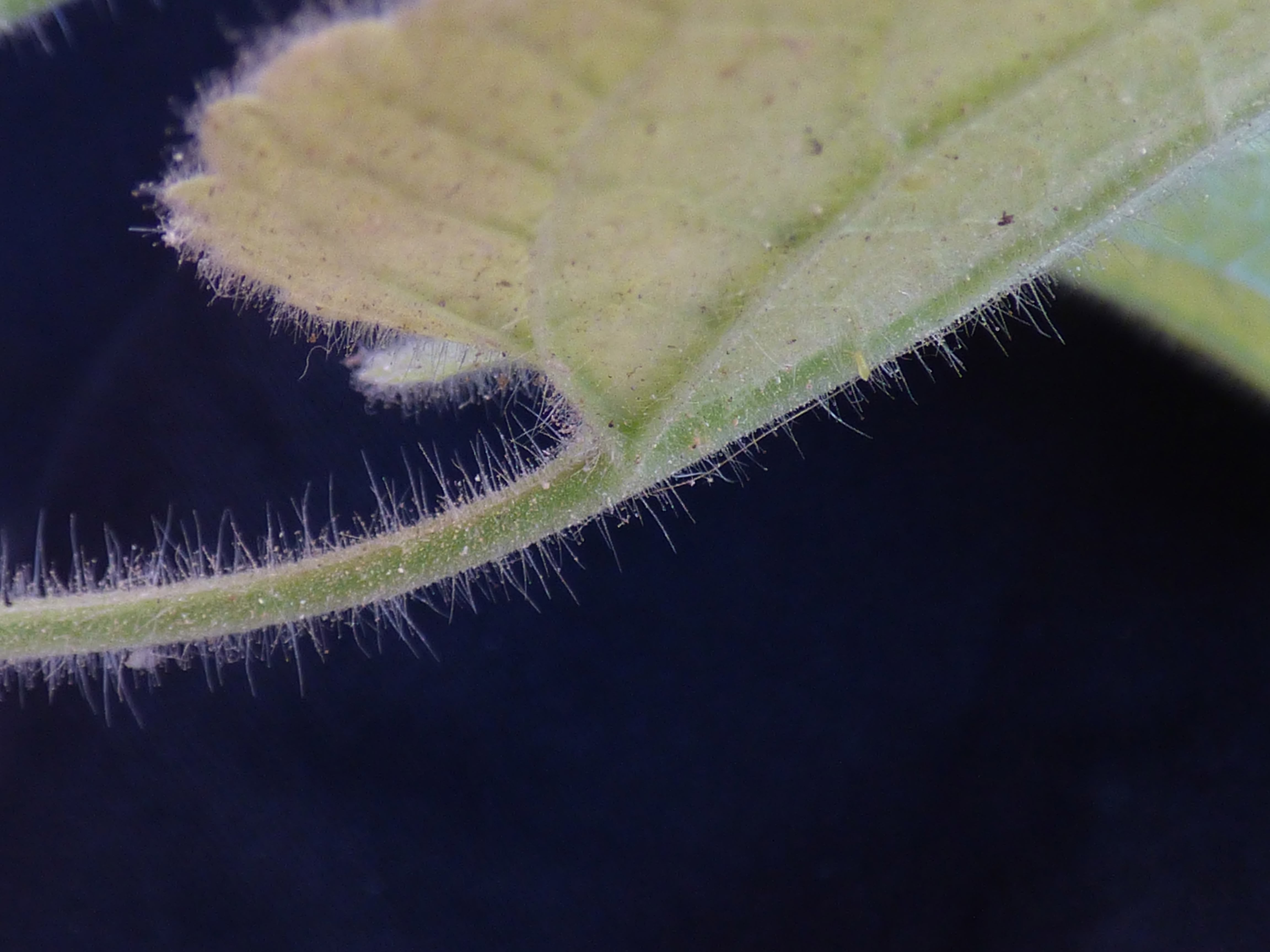
Long hairs
