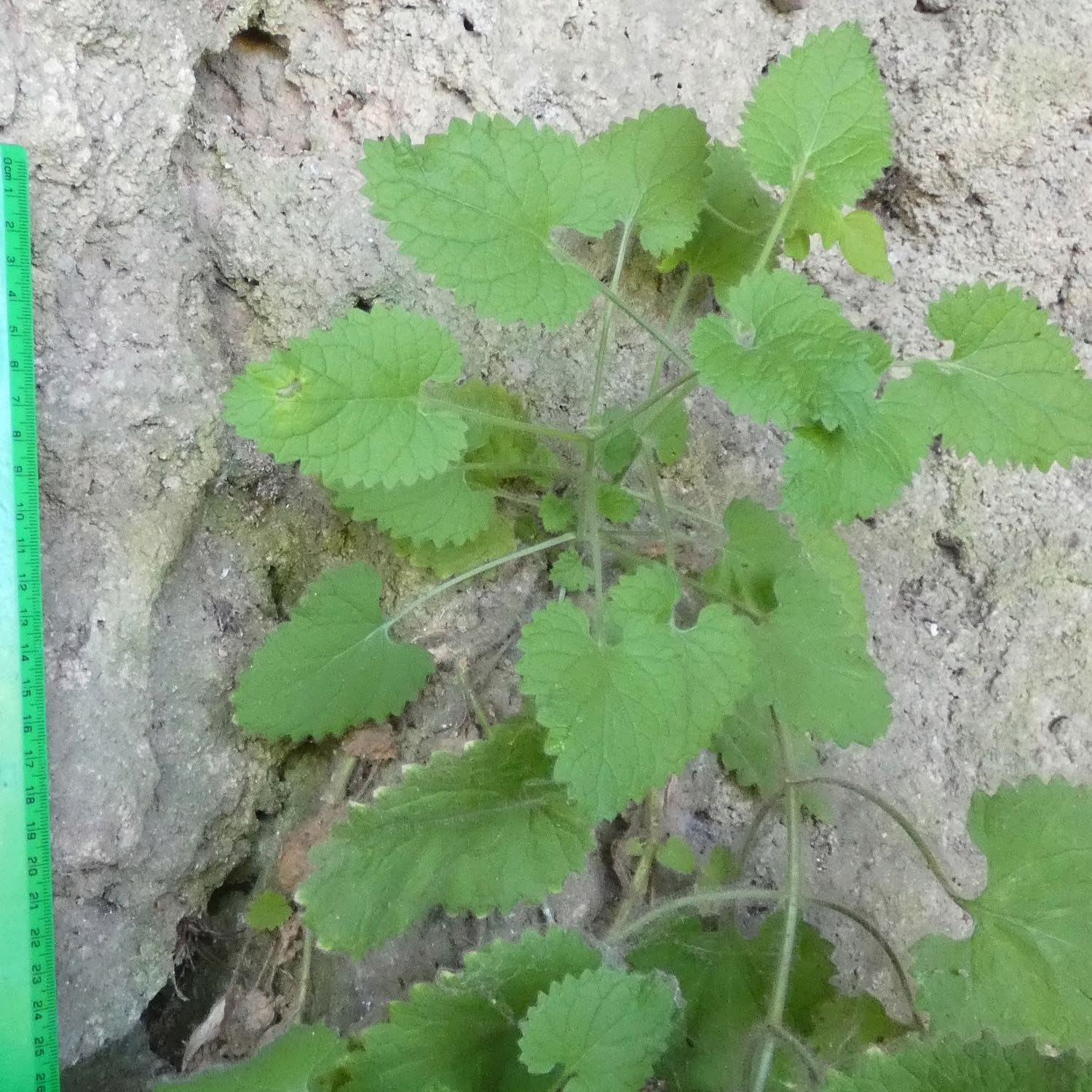

Scientific classification
- Kingdom: Plantae
- Clade: Embryophytes
- Clade: Tracheophytes
- Clade: Angiosperms
- Clade: Eudicots
- Clade: Asterids
- Order: Lamiales
- Family: Lamiaceae
- Genus: Stachys
- Species: S. buttleri

Binomial name
- Stachys buttleri R.R.Mill

= Stachys buttleri =

Species of flowering plant

Stachys buttleri is a species of flowering plant in the family Lamiaceae endemic to Turkey growing on a single rock face in Antalya.

== Description ==
Stachys buttleri is a perennial herb with fragile stems growing on the western calcareous rock face at the Upper Düden Waterfalls (Yukarı Düden Şelalesi) in Antalya, some 9 km NNE of the old city centre, 40–90 m (130–300 ft) above sea level.

It is a very finely long-hairy plant, with large, oval, broad-toothed leaves, and with medium-spaced (1-4 cm apart) whorls of white flowers set along flowering stems that tend to hang downwards. There are mostly 2 flowers per whorl, which distinguishes it from the similar Stachys pinardii nearby which generally has 4 or more per whorl.

As a plant growing just on one rock face, it is classed as CR (Critically Endangered).

Photographic details can be seen on iNaturalist.

The species is named after Dr K. P. Buttler, its discoverer and a notable collector of the Turkish flora.

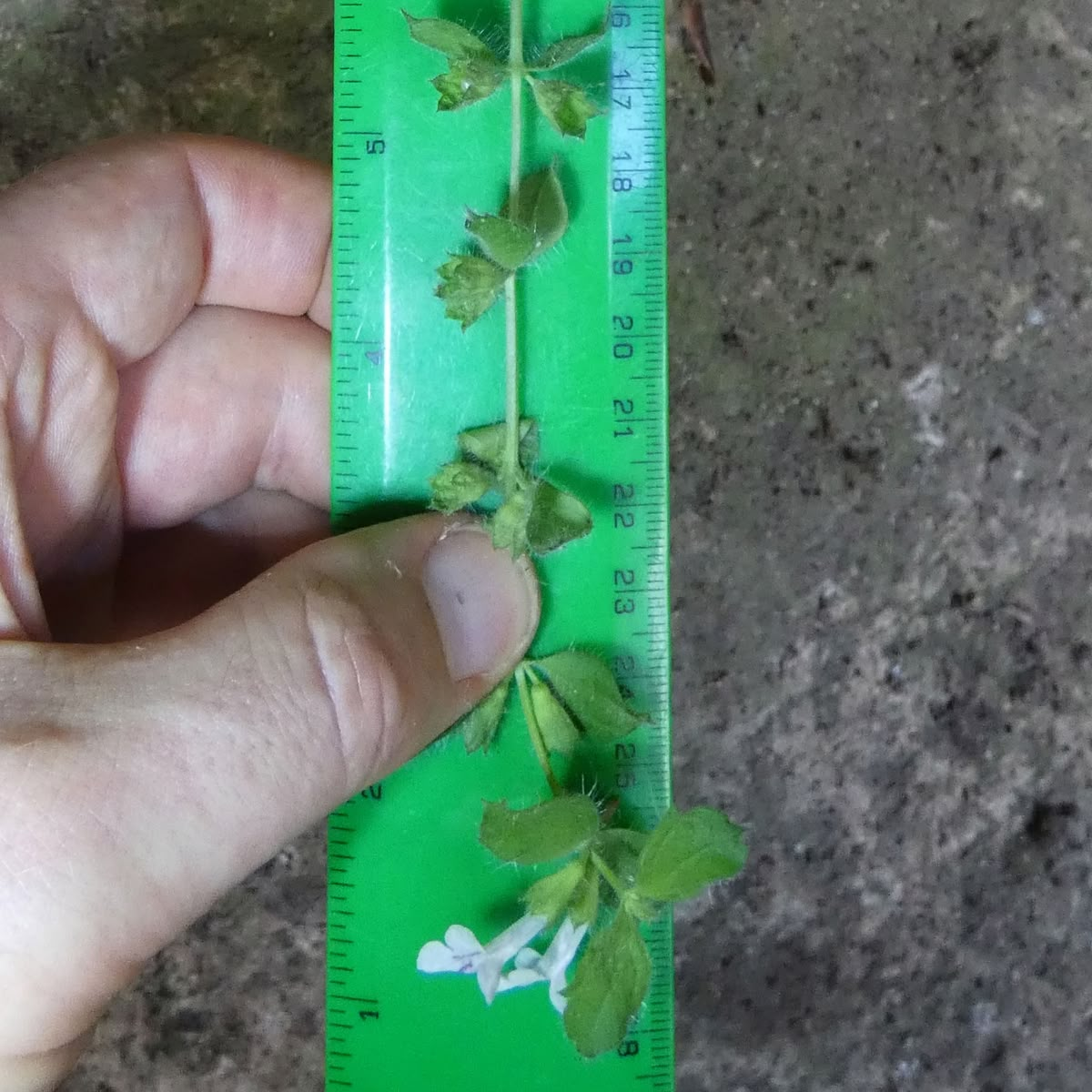
Inflorescence with whorls of 2 flowers
