= Stachys dregeana =

Conservation status
- Least Concern (SANBI Red List)

Scientific classification
- Kingdom: Plantae
- Clade: Tracheophytes
- Clade: Angiosperms
- Clade: Eudicots
- Clade: Asterids
- Order: Lamiales
- Family: Lamiaceae
- Genus: Stachys
- Species: S. dregeana

Binomial name
- Stachys dregeana Benth.

Synonyms
- Stachys dregeana var. lasiocalyx (Schltr.) Skan; Stachys dregeana var. tenuior Skan; Stachys foliosa Benth.; Stachys lasiocalyx Schltr.; Stachys rugosa var. foliosa (Benth.) Skan

Species of flowering plant

Stachys dregeana is a species of hedgenettle found in South Africa and Lesotho.

== Description ==
This species is a perennial herb growing 10–40 cm (3.9–15.7 in) tall, with one or several stems arising from a taproot. The stems are covered to varying degrees with soft, woolly hairs.

The leaves are stalkless (sessile) and thick-textured, ranging from narrow and oblong to broader and oval in shape, 15–60 mm (0.6–2.4 in) long. They have blunt to rounded tips, smooth to slightly scalloped margins, and are densely covered with fine, star-shaped hairs, especially on the underside.

The flowers are borne in a few to several small whorls along the stem, each with two to four flowers. They are pink, mauve, or purple. The calyx is densely hairy, and the corolla has a short tube with a two-lipped form, the lower lip noticeably longer than the upper.

Stachys dregeana flowers from November to March.

=== Identification ===
Stachys dregeana is closest to S. hyssopoides with which it overlaps geographically, but its leaves are distinctly hairier, and it does not form rhizomes.

== Distribution and habitat ==
Stachys dregeana grows in subalpine grassland in the Drakensberg region of Lesotho and KwaZulu-Natal, as well as adjacent areas of the Eastern Cape, as far south as Qonce.

== Etymology ==
The species epithet honours Johann Franz Drège (1794–1881), a German botanical collector and horticulturalist who extensively explored and collected plants in South Africa during the early 1800s, and who is often credited as the father of South African phytogeography.

== See also ==
- List of Lamiaceae of South Africa
