= Stachys minor =

Scientific classification
- Kingdom: Plantae
- Clade: Tracheophytes
- Clade: Angiosperms
- Clade: Eudicots
- Clade: Asterids
- Order: Lamiales
- Family: Lamiaceae
- Genus: Stachys
- Species: S. minor

Binomial name
- Stachys minor (Boiss.) Akçiçek & Dirmenci

Synonyms
- Stachys libanotica var. minor Boiss.

Species of flowering plant

Stachys minor (syn. Stachys libanotica var. minor), the little betony, small betony, or dwarf lamb's ear, is a species of flowering plant in the family Lamiaceae, native to southern Turkey. A perennial with showy flowers and a spreading habit, and hardy in USDA zones 6 through 9, it is recommended for borders, edging, rock gardens, and containers.

== Description ==
Stachys minor is a perennial herb, usually developing basal sterile rosettes. The flowering stems are upright, typically simple, and occasionally branching in the middle, ranging in height from 25 to 90 cm. These stems are often tinged red or feature reddish angles and are covered with short, stiff hairs (setulose).

The leaves are oblong to elliptic in shape, measuring 4–14 cm long and 1–4.5 cm wide, with margins that are crenate to crenate-serrate. The leaf apex varies from obtuse to acute, and the base is asymmetrically rounded. Both surfaces of the leaves have soft hairs (villous), and the leaf stalks (petioles) range from nearly absent to 8.5 cm in length.

Floral leaves, which are lanceolate to rhomboid-lanceolate, are either somewhat sessile or sessile and usually equal or surpass the length of the flower clusters (verticillasters). These verticillasters number from 3 to 11, are widely spaced 1–9 cm apart, and typically have 6–13 flowers each. Bracteoles are herbaceous, broadly lanceolate to linear or linear-subulate, 6–15 mm long, with a spinescent tip.

The calyx is slightly two-lipped (subbilabiate), shaped like a small bell (somewhat campanulate), and 8–14 mm long, with sparse hairs or becoming almost hairless. Its mouth features a hairy ring, becoming distinctly veined when fruiting. Calyx teeth are nearly equal, ovate to ovate-lanceolate or triangular, and approximately half to a third of the tube length. They recurve when fruiting, with glandular hairs along the margins, and end in sharp spines (mucros) measuring 1–1.5 mm.

The corolla is rose-coloured and 15–18 mm long, with a slightly included tube. It is distinctly two-lipped; the upper lip is entire, and the lower lip has three lobes, with the middle lobe prominently larger. The upper lip exterior is densely covered with silky hairs (sericeous-tomentose), typically surpassing its edges. The style remains within the corolla's upper lip, branching equally into two. Four stamens are contained inside the flower; the anthers are widely spreading (divaricate), and the filaments bear hairs from the base to their midsection.

Nutlets of Stachys minor are obovoid, slightly three-angled (trigonous), measure 2–3 mm long and 1.8–2.2 mm wide, and bear slight wings near the base. At maturity, they are coloured blackish-brown.

== Habitat and distribution ==
Stachys minor typically inhabits clearings and open areas within forests dominated by Pinus brutia. It is found at elevations between 500 and 550 metres. Geographically, it is known from the southern slopes of Akra Mountain, occurring in parts of Mersin and Hatay provinces in southern Turkey. Because Akra Mountain extends into Syria, the species might also occur there, although its presence across the border has not yet been confirmed.

== Taxonomy ==
Stachys minor was first described as a variety of Stachys libanotica by Pierre Edmond Boissier in 1879, under the name Stachys libanotica var. minor. It was originally documented from specimens collected in the forested lower slopes of Akra Mountain, near the region of Hatay in southern Turkey. Later, as a result of botanical investigations and morphological assessments conducted by the botanists Ekrem Akçiçek and Tuncay Dirmenci, the taxon was elevated to full species rank, becoming Stachys minor (Boiss.) Akçiçek & Dirmenci.

This taxonomic revision was prompted by the identification of consistent morphological differences that set S. minor apart from closely related species, particularly Stachys libanotica and Stachys sericantha. Compared to S. libanotica, S. minor has a notably shorter calyx tube and shorter spiny tips (mucros) on its calyx teeth. It also differs from S. sericantha, another similar species, primarily in its villous or nearly hairless calyx, with teeth that are ovate to triangular and about half to one-third as long as the tube. These features reliably distinguish it as a distinct species.
