= Margaret Levyns =

South African botanist (1890–1975)

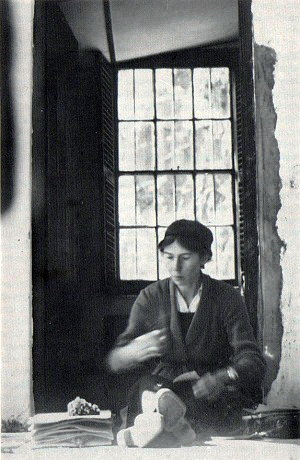
- Montagu, Cape Province, 1922
- Born: 24 August 1890; Cape Town, South Africa
- Died: 11 November 1975 (aged 85); Cape Town
- Education: Ellerslie Girls' School
- Alma mater: Newnham College, Cambridge; University of Cape Town
- Scientific career
- Fields: phytogeographer, botanist and taxonomist
- Institutions: University of Cape Town
- Thesis: A taxonomic study of Lobostemon and Echiostachys
- Author abbrev. (botany): Levyns

Margaret Rutherford Bryan Levyns (née Michell, 24 August 1890 Cape Town – 11 November 1975 Cape Town) was an eminent South African phytogeographer, botanist and taxonomist. She wrote A Guide to the Flora of the Cape Peninsula published in 1929. Several species are named for her and specimens she collected are in collections.

== Early life and education ==
Margaret Rutherford Bryan Michell, was initially educated at home by her mother and later attended Ellerslie Girls' School. She obtained a first class matriculation and was awarded two bursaries. In 1908 she enrolled at the South African College intending to study mathematics, geology and chemistry, with botany for her honours year. Prof. Harold Pearson persuaded her to take botany as a major subject. She initially studied mathematics.

After winning two scholarships, the Queen Victoria Scholarship and the 1851 Exhibition Memorial Scholarship and spending 1912-14 at Newnham College, she returned to South Africa and was promptly awarded another scholarship to the John Innes Institute where she chose to study genetics. On returning to South Africa for the second time, she took up a lecturing post in the Botany Department at the South African College which later became the University of Cape Town. She was the first woman to receive a D.Sc. degree from University of Cape Town, for her 1932 thesis 'A taxonomic study of Lobostemon and Echiostachys'. Her publications included A Guide to the Flora of the Cape Peninsula in 1929, and substantial sections of Flora of the Cape Peninsula by Adamson & Salter in 1950.

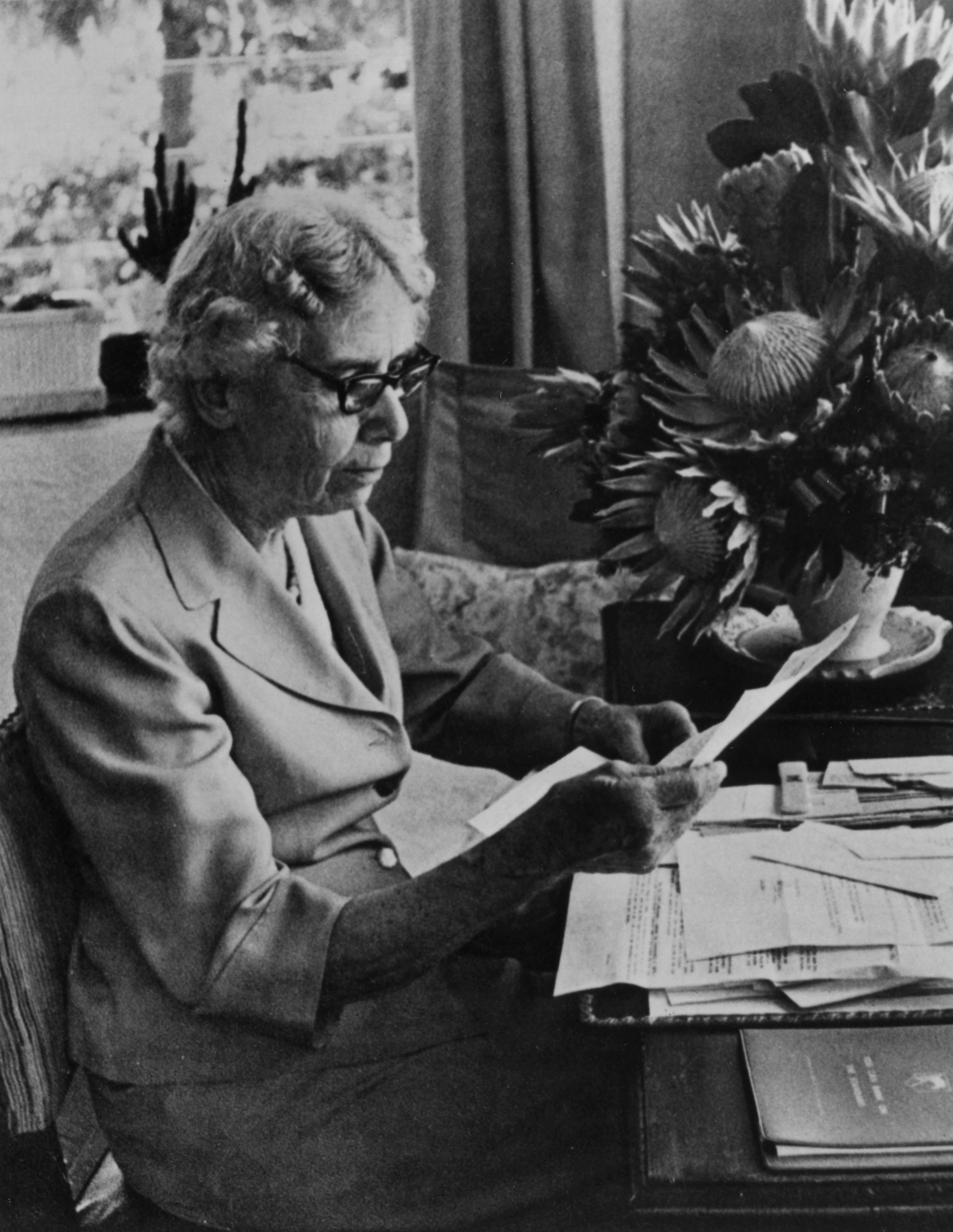

After her retirement in 1945, she remained active in the botanical field and published numerous papers on taxonomy and phytogeography. She revised a number of South African genera e.g. Muraltia. In 1923 she married John Levyns, later Assistant Provincial Secretary of the Cape Province and who served on the council of the Botanical Society of South Africa.

Margaret Levyns is commemorated in Thamnochortus levynsiae Pillans, Nivenia levynsiae H. Weimarck and Crassula levynsiae Adamson. Some 12 000 of her collected specimens are lodged with the Bolus Herbarium (BOL) in Cape Town, the National Herbarium (PRE) in Pretoria, the Royal Botanic Gardens Kew (K) and other herbaria. This botanist is denoted by the author abbreviation Levyns when citing a botanical name.

== Honours and awards ==
- President of Section B of the South African Association for Advancement of Science 1952/53
- South African Medal 1958
- President of the Royal Society of South Africa 1962/63 (first woman to hold this seat)

== See also ==
- Timeline of women in science
- List of authors of South African botanical taxa
