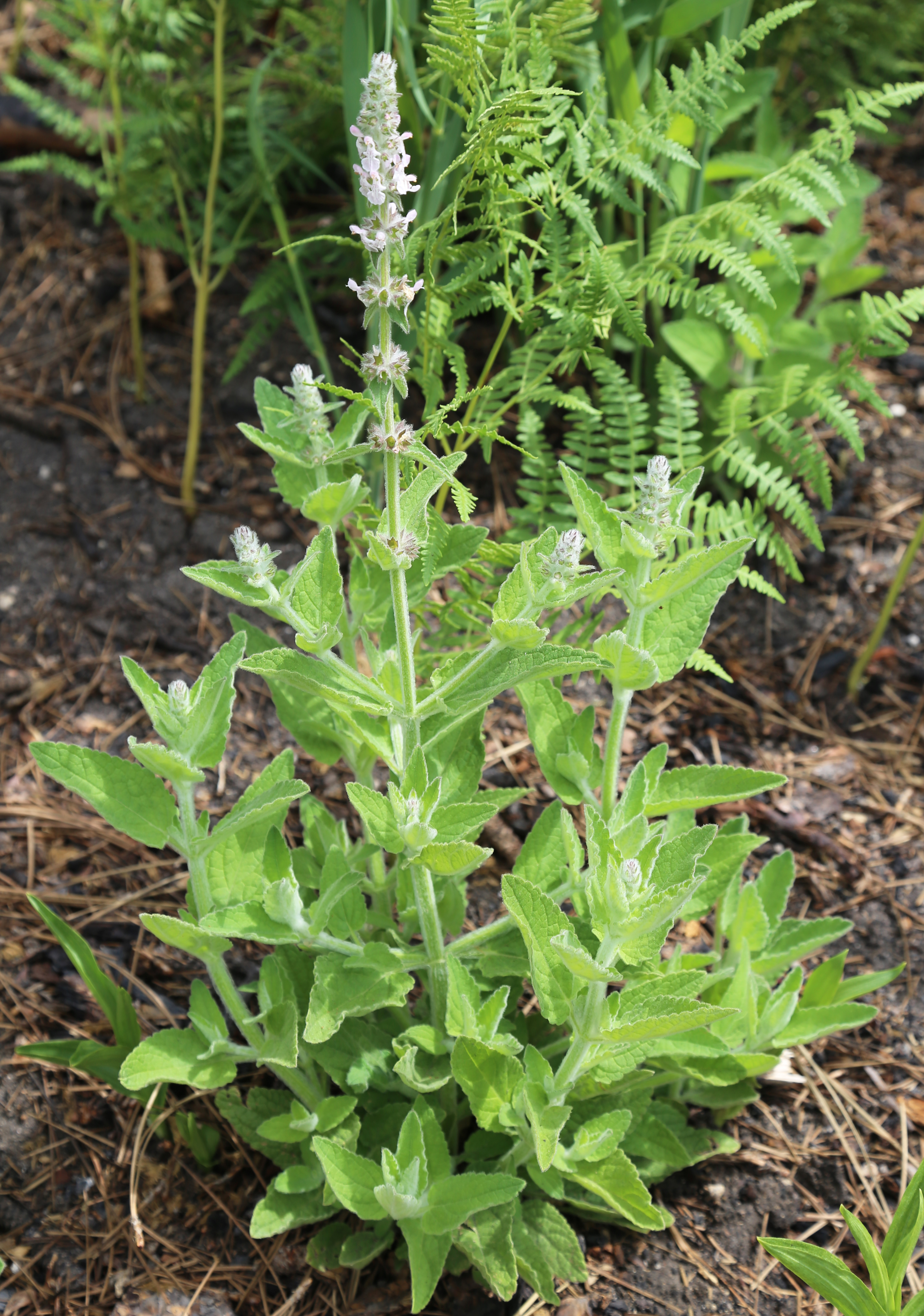

Scientific classification
- Kingdom: Plantae
- Clade: Tracheophytes
- Clade: Angiosperms
- Clade: Eudicots
- Clade: Asterids
- Order: Lamiales
- Family: Lamiaceae
- Genus: Stachys
- Species: S. albens

Binomial name
- Stachys albens A.Gray

= Stachys albens =

Species of flowering plant

Stachys albens, also known as whitestem hedgenettle or white hedgenettle, is a Stachys endemic to California. S. albens flowers have a 2-lipped, 5-lobed calyx, which is densely cob-webby and white to pinkish in color with purplish veins. The plant is fuzzy all over with opposite, triangular, serrate leaves, a square stem, a layered spike of many small flowers and a minty smell if bruised.

== Distribution ==
Stachys albens occurs between 0 (sea level) and 9000 feet, in wet, swampy to seepy places in the following plant communities:

- Foothill oak woodland.
- Coastal sage scrub.
- Yellow pine forest.
- Red fir forest.
- Lodgepole pine forest.
- California mixed evergreen forest.
- Wetland-riparian.
- Pinyon-juniper woodland - Mojave and Colorado Deserts.
