= Cathedral Rock (disambiguation) =

Cathedral Rock a is a butte in Sedona, Arizona, United States.

Cathedral Rock may also refer to:

- Cathedral Rock, Tasmania, a rock formation in Wellington Park, Tasmania, Australia
- Cathedral Rock (New York), in the Adirondack Mountains, New York, United States
- Cathedral Rock (Washington), in the Cascade Range, Washington, United States
- Cathedral Rock (Colorado), a rock formation on the grounds of the United States Air Force Academy
- Cathedral Rock (Coconino County, Arizona), in Glen Canyon National Recreation Area, Arizona, United States
- Cathedral Rock, near Waterfall Bluff, South Africa
- Cathedral Rock, a rock islet near Norfolk Island
- Cathedral Rock, a rock islet near St Abbs, Scotland, United Kingdom
- Cathedral Rocks, a series of cliffs in Victoria Land, Antarctica
- Cathedral Rock National Park, in New South Wales, Australia
- Cathedral Rock trail, on Mount Charleston, Nevada, United States

== See also ==
- Middle Cathedral Rock, a prominent rock face in Yosemite National Park, California, United States
