= Daniel Glacier =

Glacier in Washington, United States

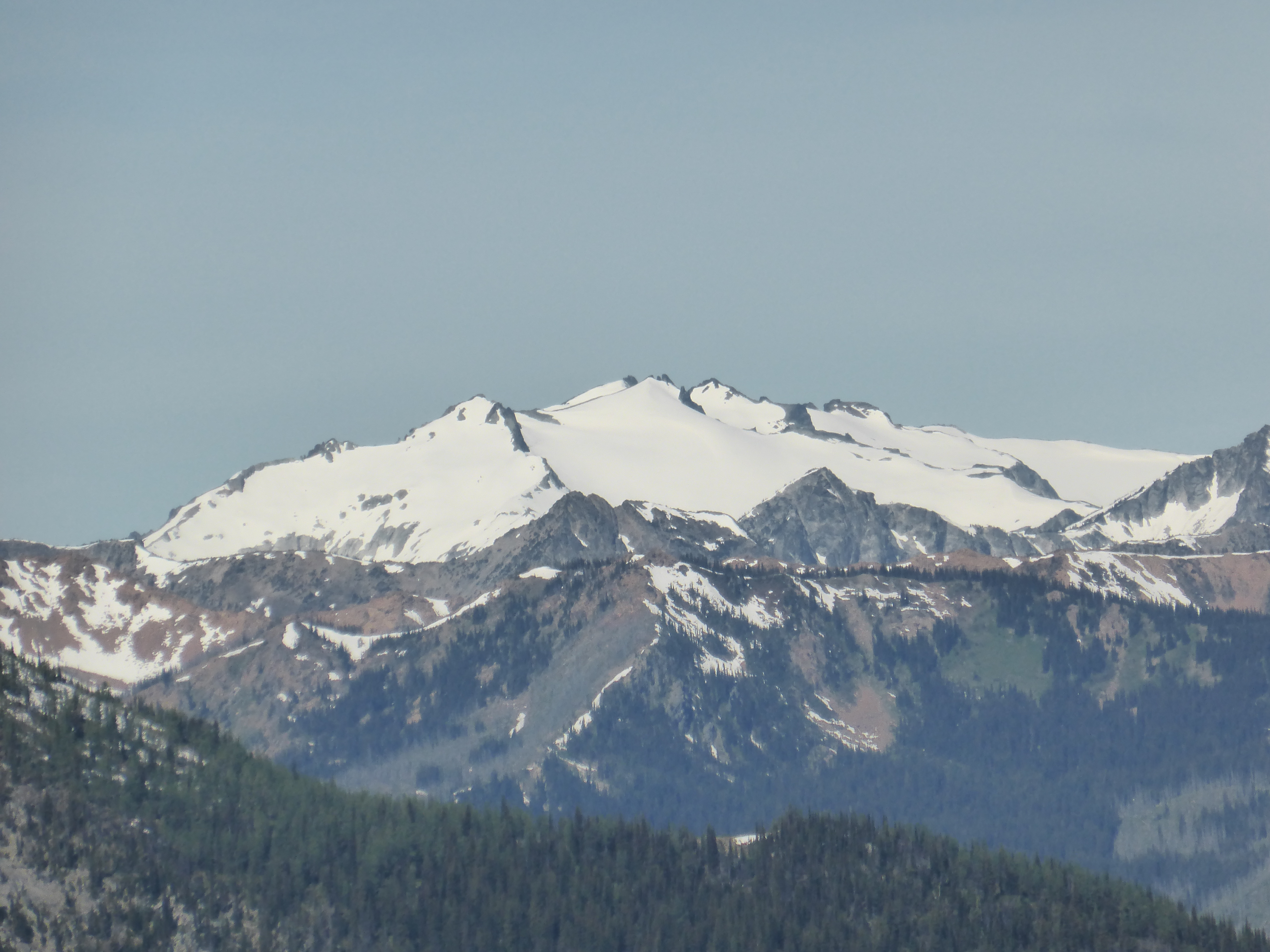
- Daniel Glacier (center)

- Location within Washington (state)
- Type: Mountain glacier
- Location: Kittitas County, Washington, U.S.
- Coordinates: 47°33′45″N 121°10′19″W
- Length: .35 mi (0.56 km)
- Terminus: Icefall
- Status: Retreating

Daniel Glacier is in Wenatchee National Forest in the U.S. state of Washington and is on the north slope of Mount Daniel. Daniel Glacier retreated almost 500 m (1,600 ft) between 1950 and 2005. Daniel Glacier is separated from Lynch Glacier to the west by a ridge.

== See also ==
- List of glaciers in the United States
