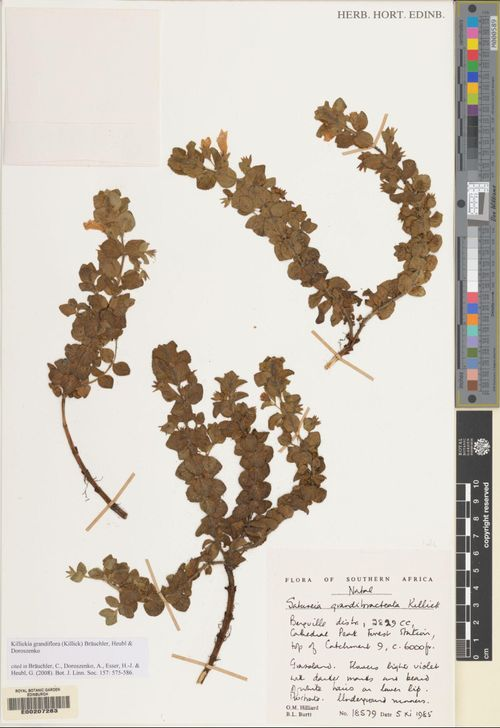
- Preserved specimen of Killickia grandiflora, collected in South Africa by the Royal Botanic Garden Edinburgh

Conservation status
- Vulnerable (SANBI Red List)

Scientific classification
- Kingdom: Plantae
- Clade: Embryophytes
- Clade: Tracheophytes
- Clade: Angiosperms
- Clade: Eudicots
- Clade: Asterids
- Order: Lamiales
- Family: Lamiaceae
- Genus: Killickia
- Species: K. grandiflora

Binomial name
- Killickia grandiflora (Killick) Brauchler, Heubl & Doroszenko

Synonyms
- Micromeria grandiflora Killick; Satureja grandibracteata Killick

= Killickia grandiflora =

Species of flowering plant

Killickia grandiflora is a rare species of bergmint. It is endemic to South Africa's KwaZulu-Natal province, where it grows in montane grassland around Cathedral Peak at about 2,000 m (6,600 ft) altitude. Occupying a reduced area of less than 8 km^{2} (3.1 sq mi), it is vulnerable to poor fire management and encroachment by invasive plant species, and is listed as Vulnerable by SANBI.

== Description ==
Killickia grandiflora is a perennial, aromatic herb with decumbent shoots 10–43 cm (3.9–16.9 in) long arising from the base. The shoots are sparsely branched and spread by underground runners, which may become thickened into a tuber-like structure from which several shoots emerge. Stems often bear small branchlets in the axils of the lower leaves.

The leaves are subsessile or borne on short petioles up to 3 mm (0.12 in) long. They are ovate to heart-shaped, measuring 10–25 mm (0.39–0.98 in) long and 7–22 mm (0.28–0.87 in) wide, with serrated margins bearing 4–8 teeth. They are reported to have a sharp mentha-like scent.

Flowers are usually solitary; only rarely do small, leafy cymes with up to four flowers develop from the axils of the bracteoles. The peduncles are 5–14 mm (0.20–0.55 in) long, with two bracteoles in the distal half, and the pedicels measure 3–9 mm (0.12–0.35 in). The bracteoles resemble the leaves and are relatively large.

The calyx is 7–8 mm (0.28–0.31 in) long at flowering and expands to 9–10 mm (0.35–0.39 in) in fruit. It is slightly bell-shaped, 15-veined, with five triangular to lance-shaped teeth that are as long as or longer than the calyx tube.

The corolla is pale to deep cobalt violet and relatively large, measuring 20–24 mm (0.79–0.94 in) in length. The corolla tube is 11–17 mm (0.43–0.67 in) long, narrow and cylindrical at the base and widening towards the throat. Two ridges run along the lower inner surface of the tube. The upper lip is shallowly notched and slightly reflexed, while the lower lip is three-lobed, with a notched central lobe and lateral lobes that may be notched or entire.

The stamens are unequal in length, with the upper pair longer than the lower; the anther cells are parallel and bear small yellow glandular structures on the connective. The style is 10–13 mm (0.39–0.51 in) long, with two unequal, pointed stigma lobes.

The fruit consists of nutlets measuring approximately 3.5 mm × 2.5 mm (0.14 in × 0.10 in).

== See also ==
- List of Lamiaceae of South Africa
