= Killickia lutea =

Conservation status
- Least Concern (SANBI Red List)

Scientific classification
- Kingdom: Plantae
- Clade: Tracheophytes
- Clade: Angiosperms
- Clade: Eudicots
- Clade: Asterids
- Order: Lamiales
- Family: Lamiaceae
- Genus: Killickia
- Species: K. lutea

Binomial name
- Killickia lutea Brauchler

Species of flowering plant

Killickia lutea is a species of Killickia sometimes called yellow bergmint. It is endemic to South Africa′s KwaZulu-Natal province, and is typically found in narrow river valleys along the southern Drakensberg, from Cobham to Garden Castle. It is most closely related to Killickia compacta.

== Description ==
Killickia lutea is a perennial herb with a strong, woody rootstock. The above-ground shoots are prostrate, forming mats, moderately branched, and may reach up to about 92 cm (36 in) in length; they occasionally root at the nodes. Internodes range from 5 to 40 mm (0.20 to 1.57 in) long. The leaves are broadly ovate to almost circular, measuring 3–21 mm (0.12–0.83 in) in both length and width, with rounded or blunt bases and tips, and crenate margins. The petioles are 2–8 mm (0.079–0.315 in) long.

The flowers are borne singly or, more often, in small cymes of three to four flowers. The peduncles are 4–19 mm (0.16–0.75 in) long, with small bracteoles along the cyme axes. Flower stalks (pedicels) measure 2–7 mm (0.08–0.28 in). The bracteoles are narrow, lance-shaped, up to 2 mm (0.08 in) long, and keeled.

The calyx is slightly bell-shaped, 3–4.5 mm (0.12–0.18 in) long, with 15 veins. Its triangular teeth are equal in length, narrow towards the tip, and closely pressed against the corolla tube, giving the impression that the upper part of the corolla is clasped by the calyx.

A highly distinctive characteristic is the colour of the corolla, which is yellow, occasionally almost white, about 5 mm (0.20 in) long, hairy on the outside and largely smooth inside. The upper lip is shallowly notched, while the lower lip is three-lobed, with rounded side lobes and a slightly notched central lobe. The stamens are unequal in length, with the lower pair slightly longer; the anther cells are parallel. The style is about 6 mm (0.24 in) long, with two very unequal stigma lobes.

The fruit consists of small nutlets measuring approximately 1.8 mm × 1.2 mm (0.07 in × 0.05 in).

== See also ==
- List of Lamiaceae of South Africa
