= Cathedral Peak =

Cathedral Peak may be any of several mountains, typically those with steep sides and towers reminiscent of a cathedral. In the United States alone, the USGS identifies 17 summits named "Cathedral Peak".

| Name | USGS link | State | County | USGS map | Coordinates | Elevation | |
|---|---|---|---|---|---|---|---|
| Cathedral Peak | | Colorado | Pitkin | Hayden Peak | 39°02′04″N 106°51′32″W | 13,934 ft | 4,247 m |
| Cathedral Peak | | Colorado | Montrose | Cathedral Peak | 38°35′12″N 107°30′45″W | 9,609 ft | 2,929 m |
| Cathedral Peak | | California | Santa Barbara | Santa Barbara | 34°29′11″N 119°42′59″W | 3,245 ft | 989 m |
| Cathedral Peak | | California | Merced | Mariposa Peak | 36°57′39″N 121°12′15″W | 3,350 ft | 1,020 m |
| Cathedral Peak | | California | Tuolumne | Tenaya Lake | 37°50′52″N 119°24′20″W | 10,853 ft | 3,308 m |
| Cathedral Peak | | Idaho | Shoshone | Cathedral Peak | 47°56′39″N 116°08′31″W | 4,924 ft | 1,501 m |
| Cathedral Peak | | Montana | Glacier | Ahern Pass | 48°52′08″N 113°51′58″W | 8,989 ft | 2,740 m |
| Cathedral Peak | | Montana | Stillwater | Cathedral Point | 45°19′56″N 109°59′12″W | 10,548 ft | 3,215 m |
| Cathedral Peak | | Montana | Flathead | Cathedral Peak | 47°49′26″N 113°18′57″W | 7,572 ft | 2,308 m |
| Cathedral Peak | | Texas | Presidio | Cuesta Del Burro West | 30°00′06″N 104°30′00″W | 4,695 ft | 1,431 m |
| Cathedral Peak | | Alaska | Aleutians East | Port Moller C-3 | 55°36′39″N 160°43′16″W | 2,415 ft | 736 m |
| Cathedral Peak | | Alaska | Juneau | Juneau C-2 | 58°36′45″N 134°21′44″W | 5,886 ft | 1,794 m |
| Cathedral Peak | | Alaska | Haines | Skagway B-2 | 59°21′57″N 135°39′30″W | 3,579 ft | 1,091 m |
| Cathedral Peak | | Washington | Okanogan | Remmel Mountain | 48°59′25″N 120°11′19″W | 8,074 ft | 2,461 m |
| Cathedral Peak | | Wyoming | Park | Cathedral Peak | 44°34′14″N 110°06′39″W | 10,548 ft | 3,215 m |
| Cathedral Peak | | Wyoming | Fremont | Lizard Head Peak | 42°49′31″N 109°10′43″W | 12,333 ft | 3,759 m |
| Cathedral Peak | | Wyoming | Fremont | Five Pockets | 43°48′00″N 109°40′02″W | 11,151 ft | 3,399 m |

In other countries:

- Cathedral Peak (South Africa), summit in the Drakensberg
- Cathedral Peak, Karakoram, peak in Karakoram

== See also ==
- Cathedral Mountain
- Cathedral Rock
- Cathedral Spires
