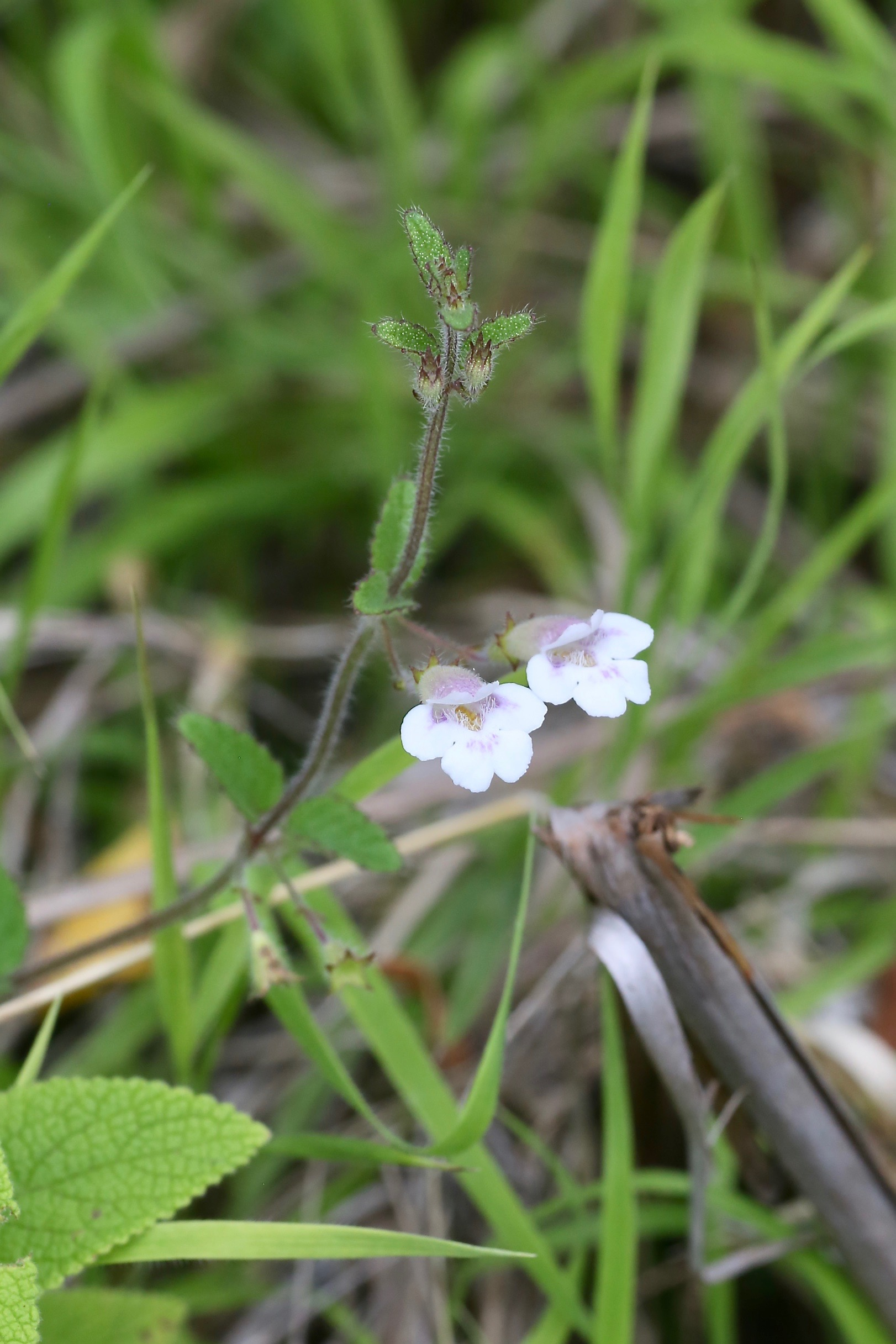

Conservation status
- Least Concern (SANBI Red List)

Scientific classification
- Kingdom: Plantae
- Clade: Embryophytes
- Clade: Tracheophytes
- Clade: Angiosperms
- Clade: Eudicots
- Clade: Asterids
- Order: Lamiales
- Family: Lamiaceae
- Genus: Killickia
- Species: K. pilosa

Binomial name
- Killickia pilosa (Benth.) Bräuchler, Heubl & Doroszenko

Synonyms
- Micromeria pilosa Benth.; Satureja reptans Killick

= Killickia pilosa =

Species of flowering plant

Killickia pilosa is a species of Killickia sometimes called white bergmint. It is endemic to South Africa's KwaZulu-Natal province, and is typically found in montane grassland in the uKhahlamba-Drakensberg Park and adjacent midlands at 1,500–2,500 m (4,900–8,200 ft) altitude. It is the most widely distributed species in the genus.

== Description ==
Killickia pilosa is a prostrate, aromatic perennial herb with slender, spreading branches up to about 75 cm (30 in) long. The internodes measure 1–5 cm (0.4–2.0 in). The leaves are ovate, with the basal leaves sometimes almost circular, measuring 7–28 mm (0.28–1.10 in) long and 6–27 mm (0.24–1.06 in) wide, though smaller on creeping stems. Leaf tips range from acute to rounded, the bases are shallowly heart-shaped to broadly wedge-shaped, and the margins are crenate with a small number of teeth. Petioles are 1–5 mm (0.04–0.20 in) long.

Flowers occur singly or in pairs per bract, and only very rarely in larger, loose cymes. The peduncles are thread-like and 5–24 mm (0.20–0.94 in) long, bearing two small bracteoles in the distal half; the pedicels are 1–10 mm (0.04–0.39 in) long. The bracteoles are narrow and linear, measuring 1–2.5 mm (0.04–0.10 in).

The calyx is bell-shaped, with 15 veins and a tube 1.5–4 mm (0.06–0.16 in) long. The triangular calyx teeth are 1–2 mm (0.04–0.08 in) long, straight to slightly curved outward, and expand as the fruit develops.

The corolla is almost white (especially in the midlands) to violet-tinged (especially around Cathedral Peak), often creamy yellow on the lower side between two hairy ridges, and measures 9–19 mm (0.35–0.75 in) in length. The corolla tube is 5–12 mm (0.20–0.47 in) long and 3–7 mm (0.12–0.28 in) wide at the mouth. The upper lip is shallowly notched, while the lower lip curves downward and is three-lobed, with a larger, notched central lobe and smaller rounded side lobes.

The stamens are unequal, with the lower pair markedly longer than the upper; the anthers are under 1 mm (0.04 in) long. The floral disc is slightly lobed. The style is straight, about 1 cm (0.39 in) long, and lies within a groove on the upper inner surface of the corolla tube. The stigma lobes are very unequal, with the forward-facing lobe larger and rhomboid, and the rear lobe very short and thread-like.

The fruit consists of small nutlets measuring approximately 2 mm × 1 mm (0.08 in × 0.04 in).

== See also ==
- List of Lamiaceae of South Africa
