= Mount Daniel =

Mountain in Washington (state), United States

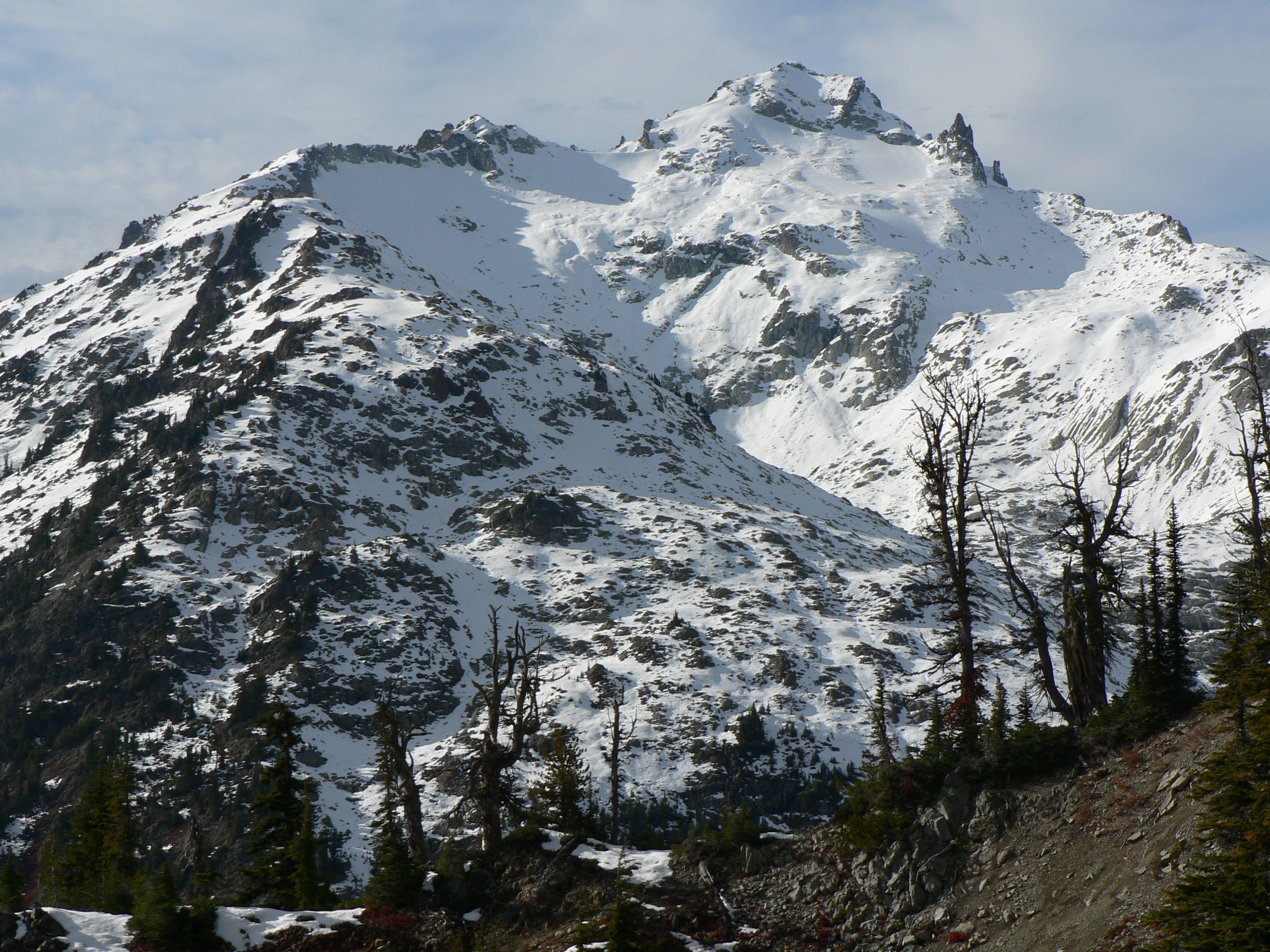

Highest point
- Elevation: 7,960+ ft (2,430+ m) NGVD 29
- Prominence: 3,480 ft (1,060 m)
- Coordinates: States, Washington_type:mountain_source:pb 47°33′54″N 121°10′51″W

Geography
- Location: King / Kittitas counties, Washington, U.S.
- Parent range: Cascade Range
- Topo map: USGS Mount Daniel

Geology
- Rock age: Oligocene

Climbing
- First ascent: 1925
- Easiest route: Hike from Peggys Pond

Mount Daniel is the highest summit on the Cascade Range crest of Alpine Lakes Wilderness of the central Washington, United States. It is the highest point in King and Kittitas counties. Streams on its eastern slopes form the headwaters of the Cle Elum River.

== Geology ==
Mount Daniel's volcanic rock is composed of andesite, dacite, and rhyolite inflows, breccia, and tuff. Volcanic sandstone is interbedded. Just west of Mount Daniel is the Mount Hinman plutonic stock.

== Peaks ==
From most vantages Mount Daniel appears to be a triple-crowned mass, but five summits can be identified.

- West Summit (7,960+ ft (2,430+ m))
- Middle Summit (7,959 ft or 2,426 m)
- East Peak (7,899 ft or 2,408 m)
- West Pyramid (7,880+ ft (2,400+ m))
- Northwest Summit (7,686 ft or 2,343 m)

These elevations are based on Sea Level Datum of 1929 and are taken from the Mount Daniels 7.5 minute topographic map which was published in 1965. The United States Board on Geographic Names has assigned the name Mount Daniel to the east peak even though it is not the highest.

== Glaciers ==
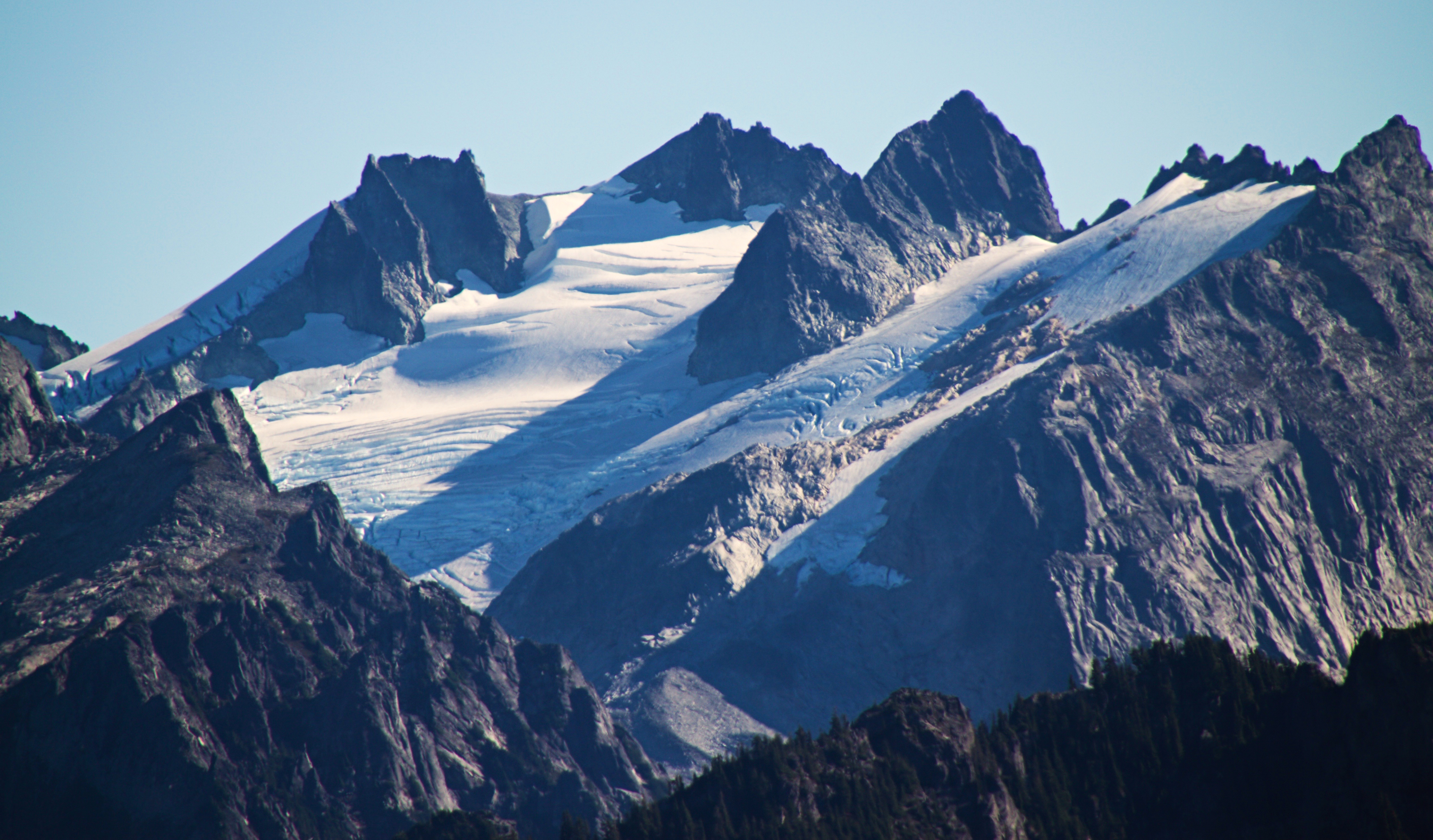
North aspect of Daniel featuring Lynch Glacier.

Mount Daniel supports several glaciers, the largest of which is Lynch Glacier on the northwest slope of the mountain. Lynch Glacier extends from 7,800 feet (2,377 m) to 6,220 feet (1,896 m), where it melts into Pea Soup Lake, draining to the East Fork Foss River. The West Lynch Glacier hangs from the north slope of the Northwest Peak of Mount Daniel. West Lynch Glacier was formerly connected to Lynch Glacier. On the north side of the ridge between the Middle Summit and East Peak is another glacier with the tentative name of Daniel Glacier. It is partially connected to Lynch Glacier. Daniel Glacier is losing mass and was once much larger. Several small remnants, now just perennial snow accumulations rather than living glaciers, are located east of Daniel Glacier. On the southeast side of Mount Daniel, nested against a cirque headwall, is the Hyas Creek Glacier, an isolated and small ice mass that was once much larger. It drains to Hyas Creek and Peggy's Pond. All the glaciers on Mount Daniel are thinning and becoming stagnant. West Lynch Glacier is expected to disappear in the near future.

== History ==
The first known ascent of Mount Daniel was by The Mountaineers 1925 outing, but it is likely that surveyors had already ascended Daniel. The 1925 party climbed via Lynch Glacier.

== Climbing Route ==
The standard route to the summit passes Cathedral Rock, Peggy's Pond, and then is a scramble up to summit.

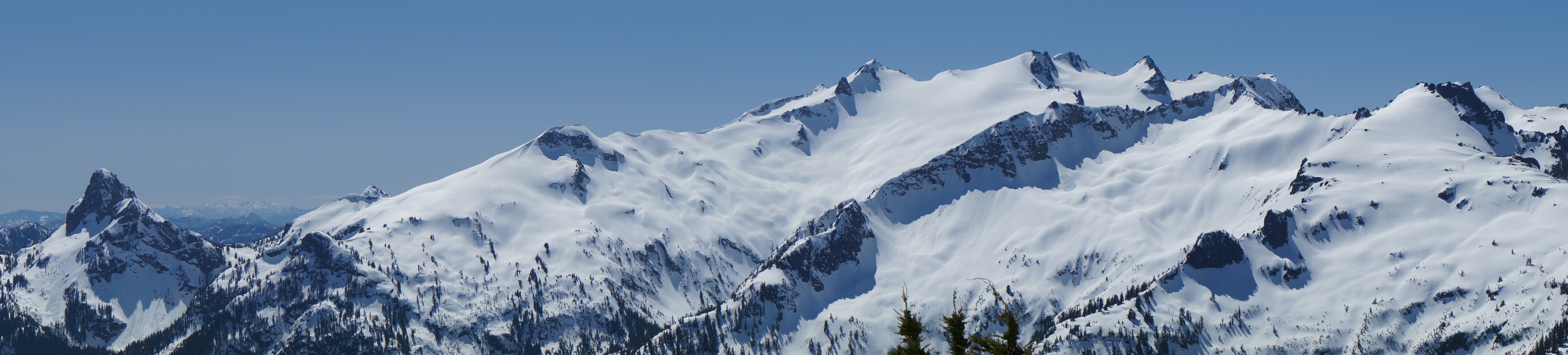
Mt. Daniel with Cathedral Rock (left)

== See also ==
- List of mountains of the United States
- List of mountains by elevation
