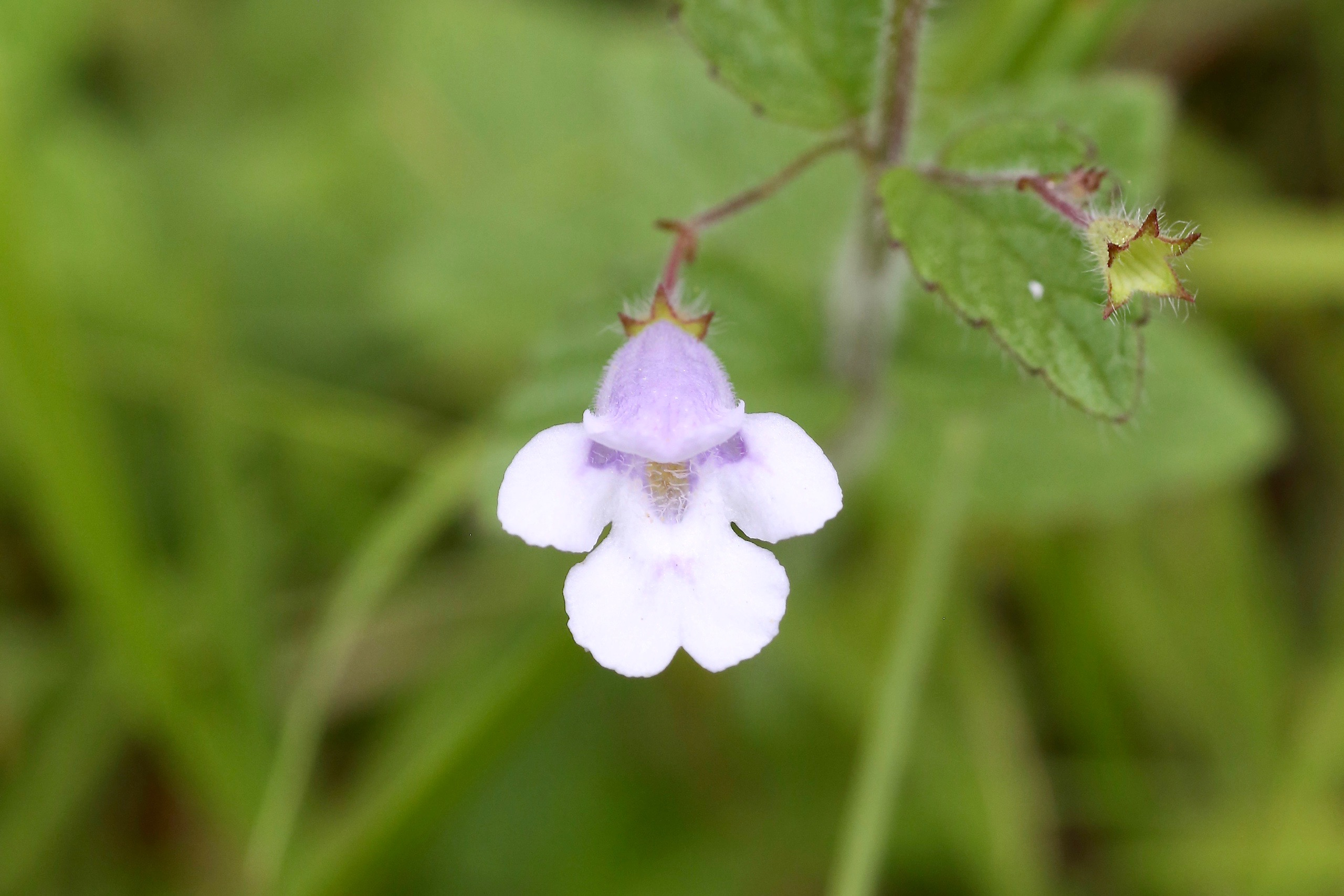
- Killickia pilosa

Scientific classification
- Kingdom: Plantae
- Clade: Tracheophytes
- Clade: Angiosperms
- Clade: Eudicots
- Clade: Asterids
- Order: Lamiales
- Family: Lamiaceae
- Genus: Killickia; Bräuchler, Heubl & Doroszenko

= Killickia =

Genus of plants

Killickia is a genus of flowering plants belonging to the family Lamiaceae. Described in 2008, the genus includes three species that were formerly placed in Micromeria section Hesperothymus, although it more closely resembles Clinopodium in habit and leaf shape.

Killickia is endemic to the grassland of the KwaZulu-Natal Drakensberg mountains and midlands.

Species:

- Killickia compacta (Killick) Bräuchler, Heubl & Doroszenko
- Killickia grandiflora (Killick) Bräuchler, Heubl & Doroszenko
- Killickia lutea Bräuchler
- Killickia pilosa (Benth.) Bräuchler, Heubl & Doroszenko
