= Cathedral Rock, Tasmania =

Rock formation in Wellington Park, Tasmania, Australia

Coordinates: 42°56′11″S 147°11′30″E

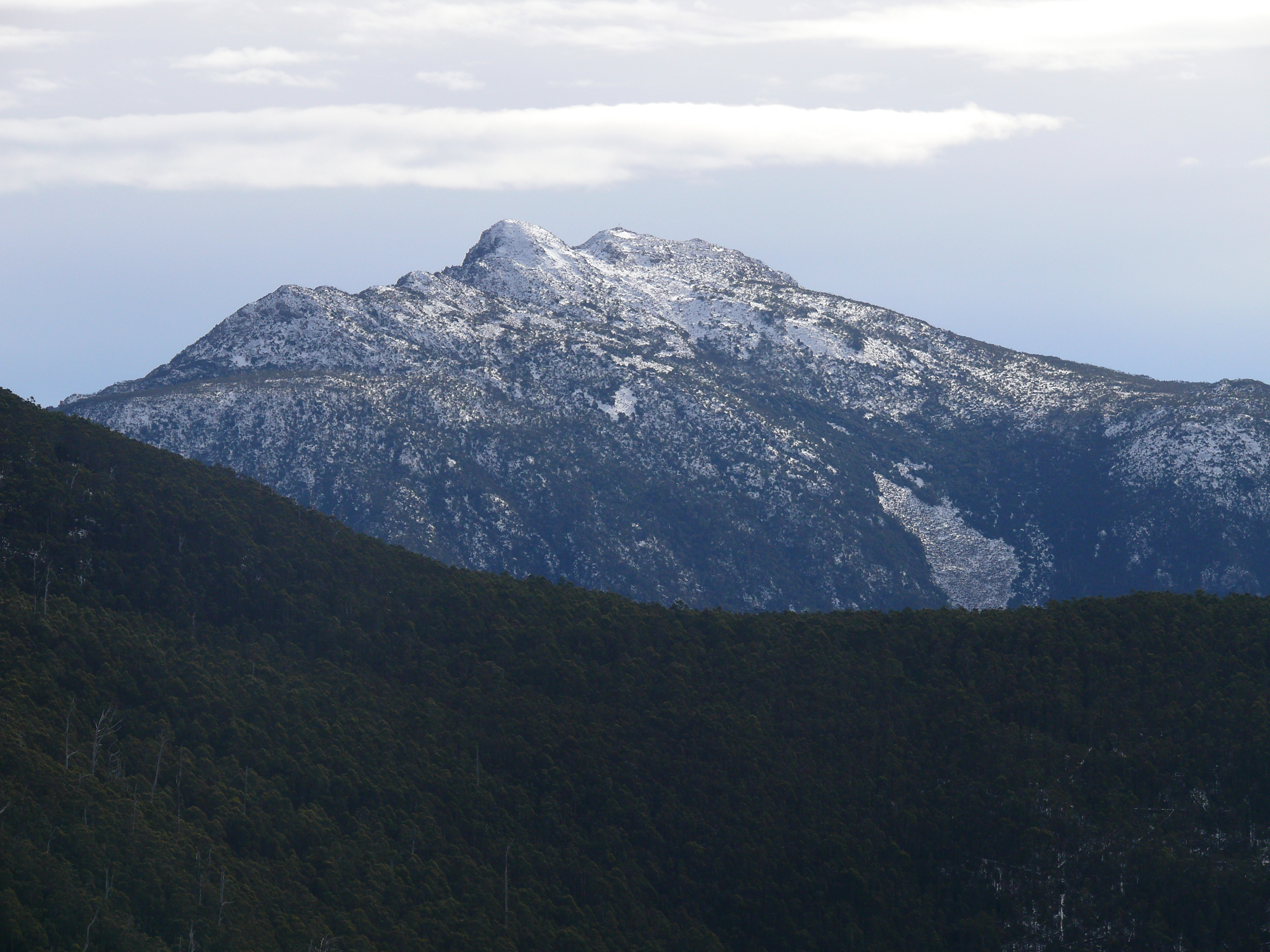
View from Cathedral Rock

Cathedral Rock is a towering dolerite rock formation located in Wellington Park in south-eastern Tasmania.

Reaching a height of approximately 880 metres and accessed through a challenging walk, the craggy summit offers expansive views of southern Tasmania, particularly the Huon Valley and the Channel region.

Cathedral Rock is a popular destination for recreational hikers and nature lovers. The closest township is Neika and the usual starting point for the walk to the peak is Betts Road on the North West Bay River. During winter months, Cathedral Rock is frequently snow-covered.

Cathedral Rock is part of Wellington Park and is reserved under the Wellington Park Act 1993. It is managed by the Wellington Park Management Trust, together with the City Councils of Glenorchy and Hobart, the Tasmania Parks and Wildlife Service and Southern Water. Wellington Park takes its name from Mount Wellington, named after Arthur Wellesley, 1st Duke of Wellington, who defeated Napoleon in the Battle of Waterloo.

Wellington Park is reserved for the purposes of: "the provision of tourism and recreation; the protection of flora and fauna; the preservation of features of natural beauty or scenic interest; the protection of features of historical, Aboriginal, archaeological, scientific or geomorphological interest; and the protection of water catchment values".
