= Killickia compacta =

Conservation status
- Least Concern (SANBI Red List)

Scientific classification
- Kingdom: Plantae
- Clade: Tracheophytes
- Clade: Angiosperms
- Clade: Eudicots
- Clade: Asterids
- Order: Lamiales
- Family: Lamiaceae
- Genus: Killickia
- Species: K. compacta

Binomial name
- Killickia compacta (Killick) Bräuchler, Heubl & Doroszenko

Synonyms
- Micromeria compacta (Killick) R.Morales; Satureja compacta Killick

Species of flowering plant

Killickia compacta is a rare species of Killickia sometimes called matting bergmint. It is endemic to South Africa′s KwaZulu-Natal province, and is found in only two locations in the central Drakensberg mountains around Cathkin Peak, at around 2,300 m (7,500 ft) in altitude. Although highly localised, it is not considered threatened.

== Description ==
Killickia compacta is a perennial herb with a strong, woody rootstock. Above-ground shoots are prostrate, mat-forming, and densely branched, reaching up to about 40 cm (16 in) in length. Shoots may root at the nodes and can also spread by fragmentation, forming clonal patches. Internodes are typically 5–15 mm (0.20–0.59 in) long, occasionally up to 2 cm (0.8 in).

The leaves are broadly ovate to almost circular, measuring 3–11 mm (0.12–0.43 in) long and 2–10 mm (0.08–0.39 in) wide, with rounded bases and tips and shallowly crenate margins. The petioles are 2–4 mm (0.08–0.16 in) long.

Flowers are solitary, with more than one flower per cyme recorded only rarely. The peduncles are very short, usually 0.1–1.5 mm (0.004–0.059 in) and always under 3 mm (0.12 in). The cyme axis bears two small bracteoles, typically in the proximal half. Flower stalks (pedicels) are 1–2.5 mm (0.04–0.10 in) long. The bracteoles are narrow, lance-shaped, about 1.5 mm (0.06 in) long, and keeled.

The calyx is bell-shaped, with 15 veins and a tube just under 2 mm (0.08 in) long. The triangular to lance-shaped calyx teeth are about 2 mm (0.08 in) long and curve outward, leaving the upper part of the corolla tube exposed. The corolla is cobalt violet, 3–5 mm (0.12–0.20 in) long, hairy on the outside and largely smooth inside. The upper lip is shallowly notched, while the lower lip curves downward and is three-lobed, with rounded lateral lobes and a slightly notched central lobe.

The stamens are unequal in length, with the lower pair longer; the anther cells diverge from each other. The style is about 6 mm (0.24 in) long, with two very unequal stigma lobes.

The fruit consists of small nutlets approximately 1.8 mm × 1.2 mm (0.07 in × 0.05 in) in size.

== See also ==
- List of Lamiaceae of South Africa
