= Cathedral Rock (Coconino County, Arizona) =

Landform in the Colorado Plateau

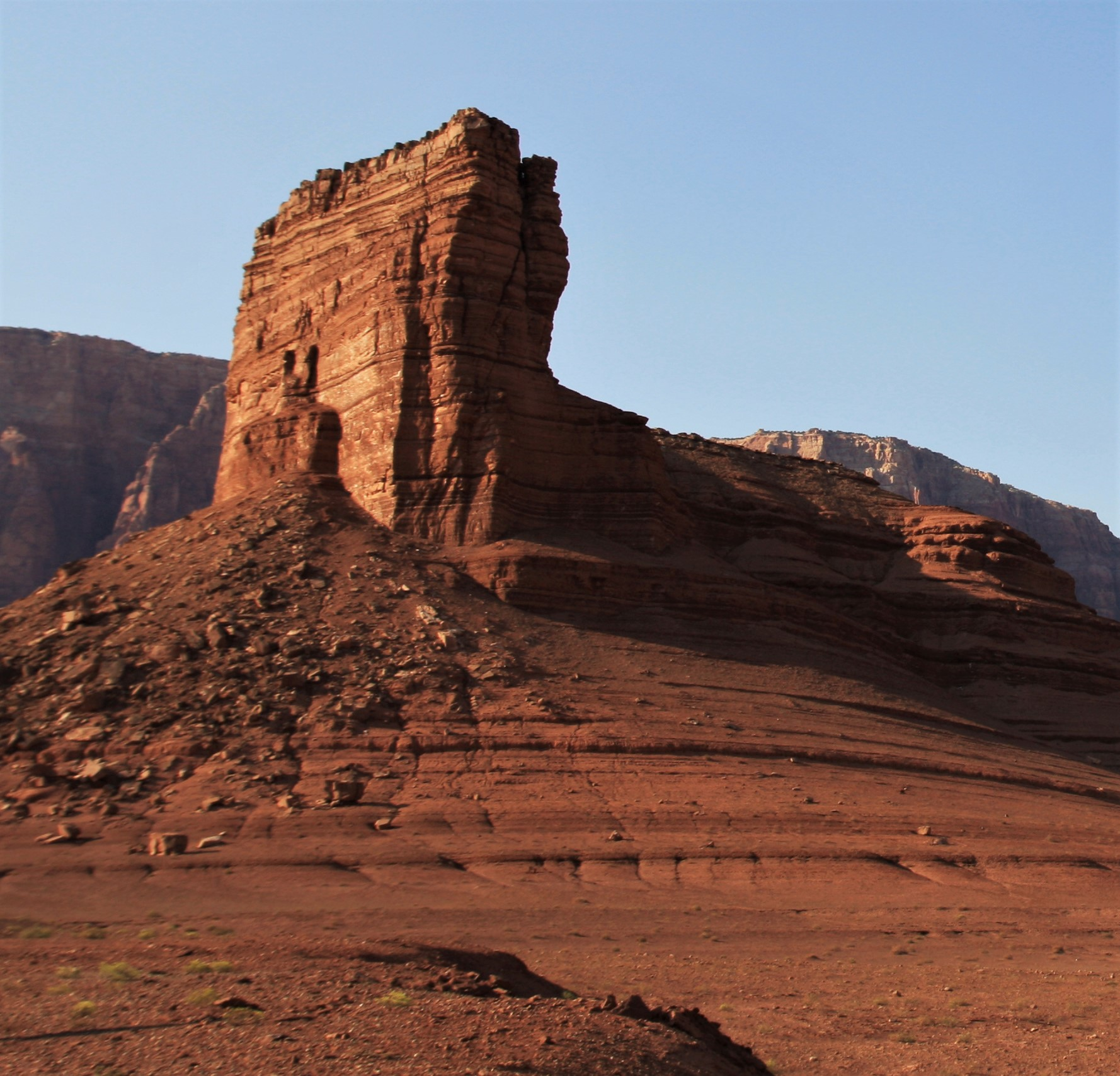
- Southeast aspect

Highest point
- Elevation: 3,942 ft (1,202 m)
- Prominence: 342 ft (104 m)
- Parent peak: Paria Plateau
- Isolation: 2.61 mi (4.20 km)
- Coordinates: 36°49′42″N 111°38′23″W

Geography
- Location within Arizona Location within the United States
- Location: Glen Canyon National Recreation Area; Coconino County, Arizona, U.S.
- Parent range: Colorado Plateau
- Topo map: USGS Navajo Bridge

Geology
- Rock age: Triassic
- Rock type: Sandstone

Climbing
- Easiest route: class 3+ scrambling

Cathedral Rock is a 3,942-foot-elevation (1,202 m) pillar located within Glen Canyon National Recreation Area, in Coconino County of northern Arizona. It is situated less than one mile northwest of Navajo Bridge, and three miles (4.8 km) southwest of Lee's Ferry and the confluence of the Paria and Colorado Rivers, where it towers over 400 feet (120 m) above the surrounding terrain as a landmark of the area. It can be seen from nearby U.S. Route 89A (US 89A) at Marble Canyon. This geographical feature's name was bestowed prior to 1900, and officially adopted in 1969 by the U.S. Board on Geographic Names.

== Geology ==
Cathedral Rock is located on the Colorado Plateau. This erosional remnant is composed of red sandstone of the Moenkopi Formation, which was laid down during the Triassic. It is overlain by a Shinarump Conglomerate caprock. Precipitation runoff from this feature drains to the nearby Colorado River, one-half mile to the east.

== Climate ==
According to the Köppen climate classification system, Cathedral Rock is located in an arid climate zone with hot, very dry summers, and chilly winters with very little snow. Climate data for Page, Arizona, 12 miles to the northeast.

== See also ==
- Colorado Plateau
- List of rock formations in the United States

== Gallery ==
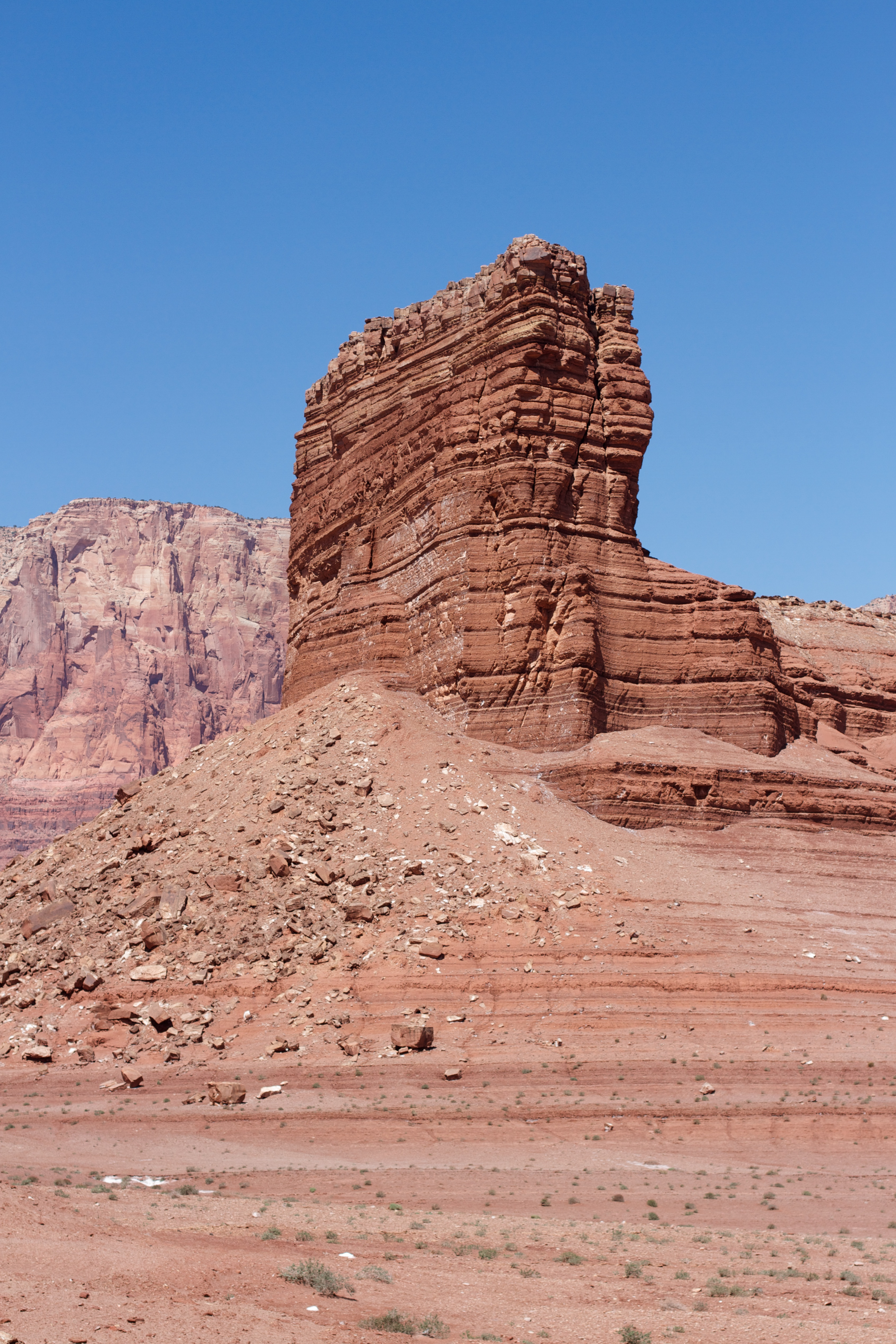

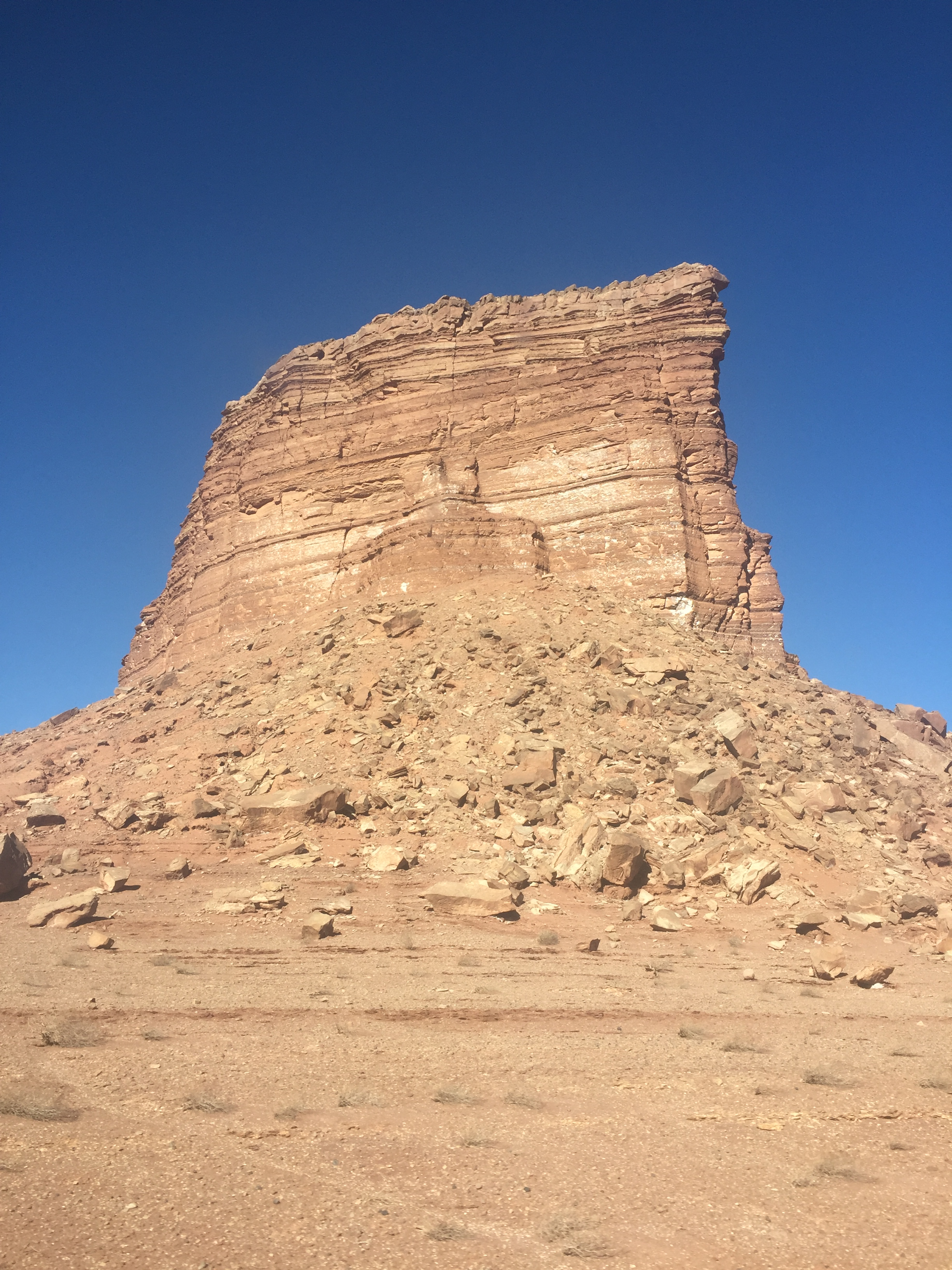
South face

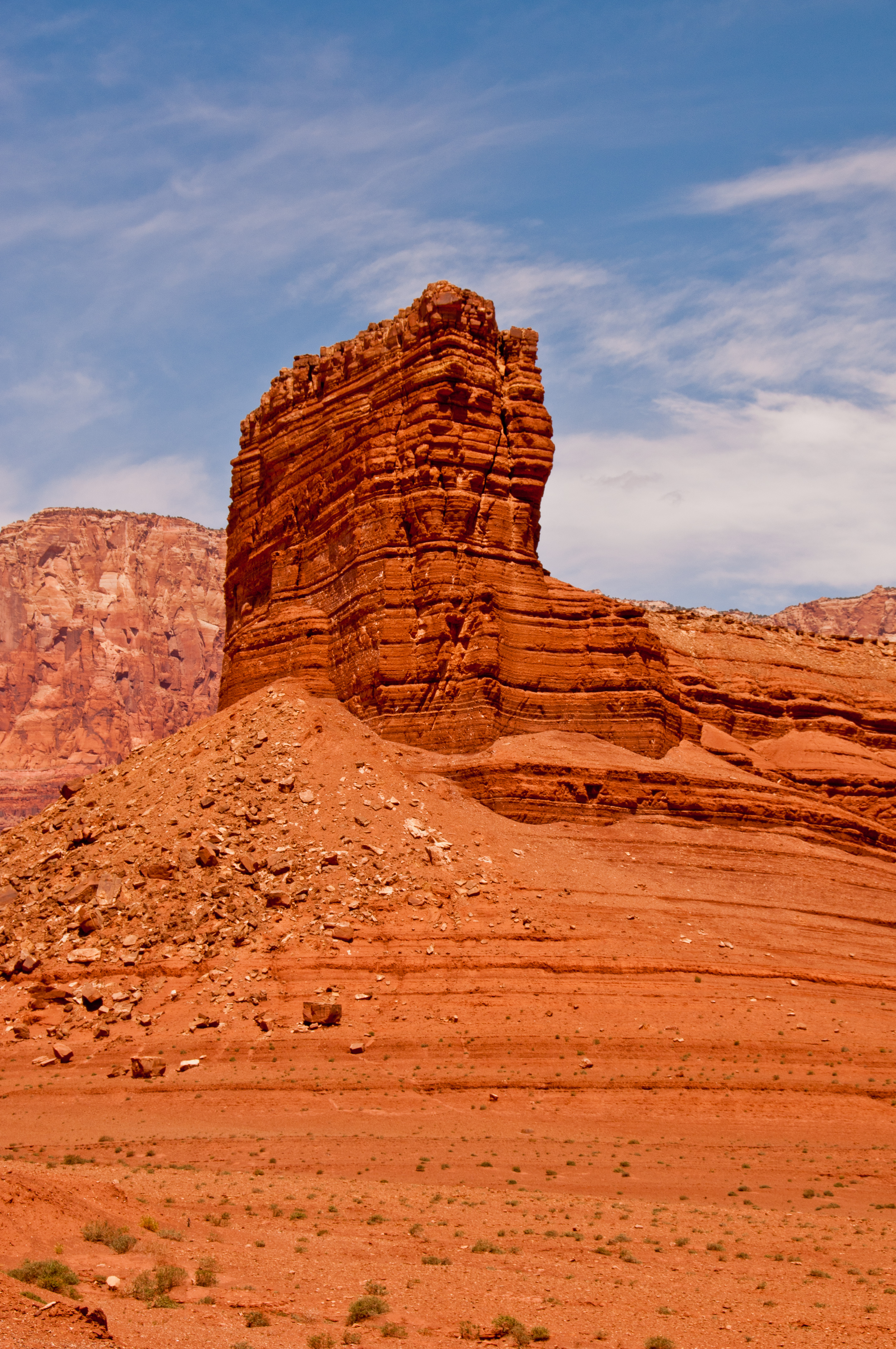

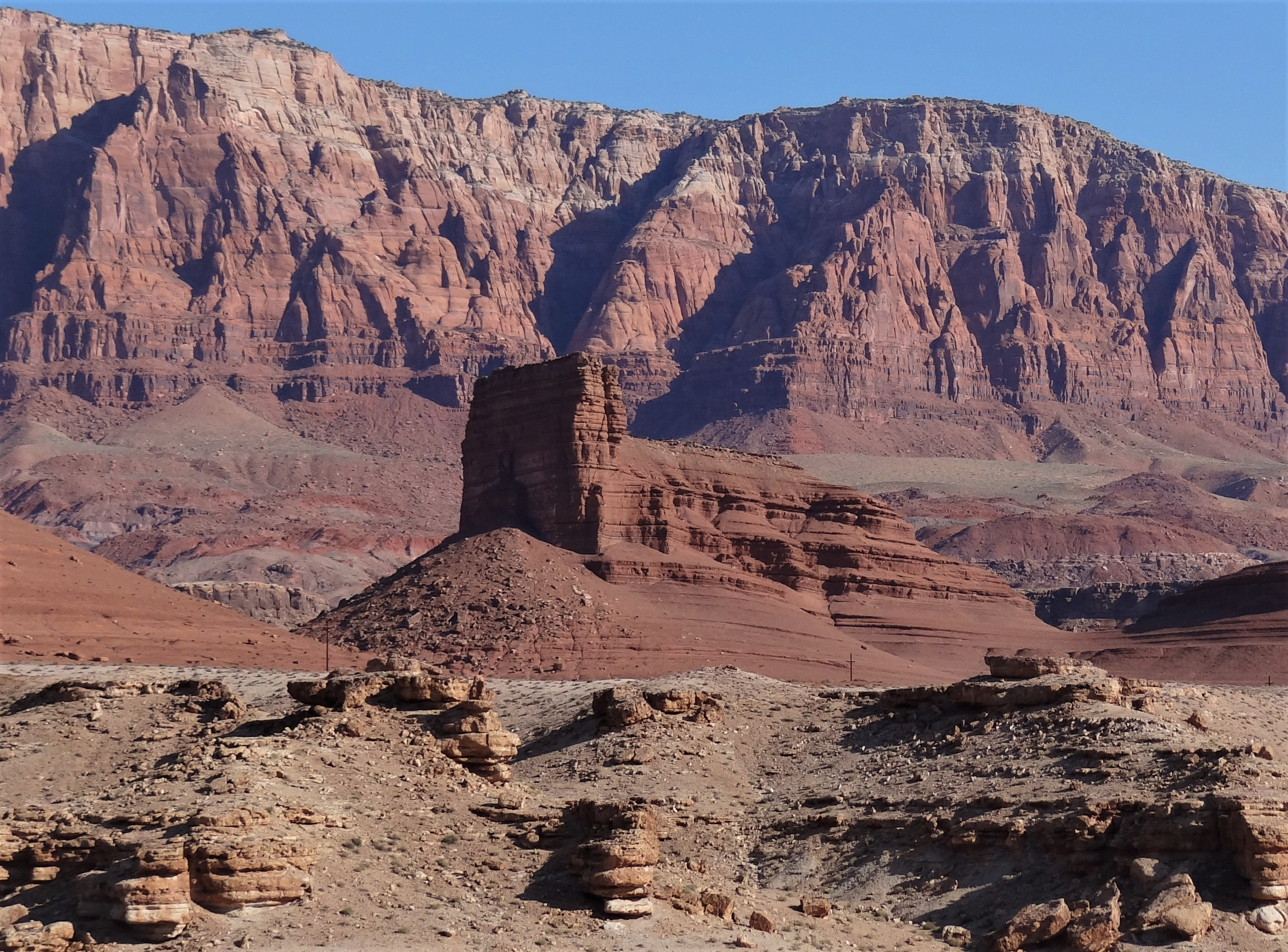
Cathedral Rock, with Vermilion Cliffs behind

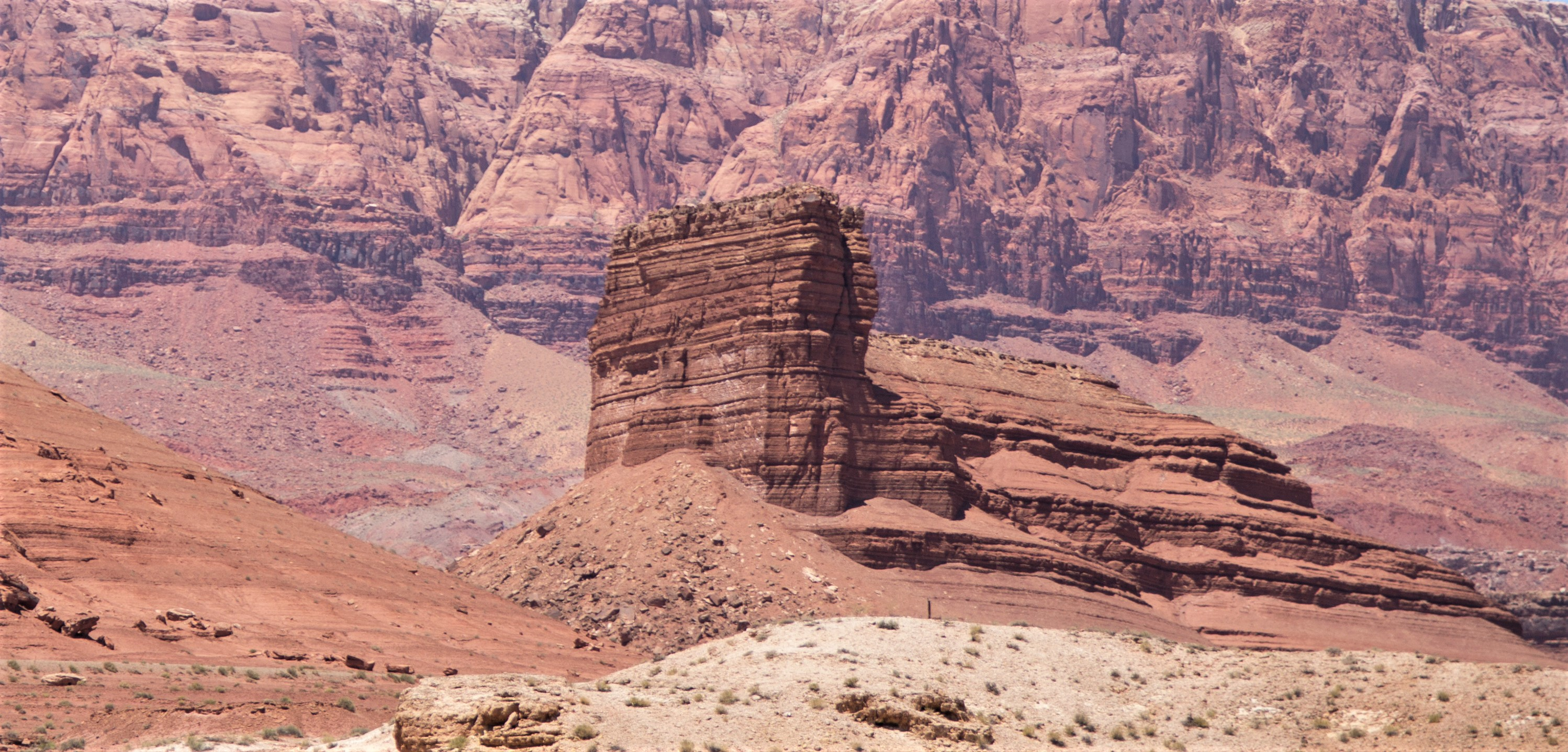

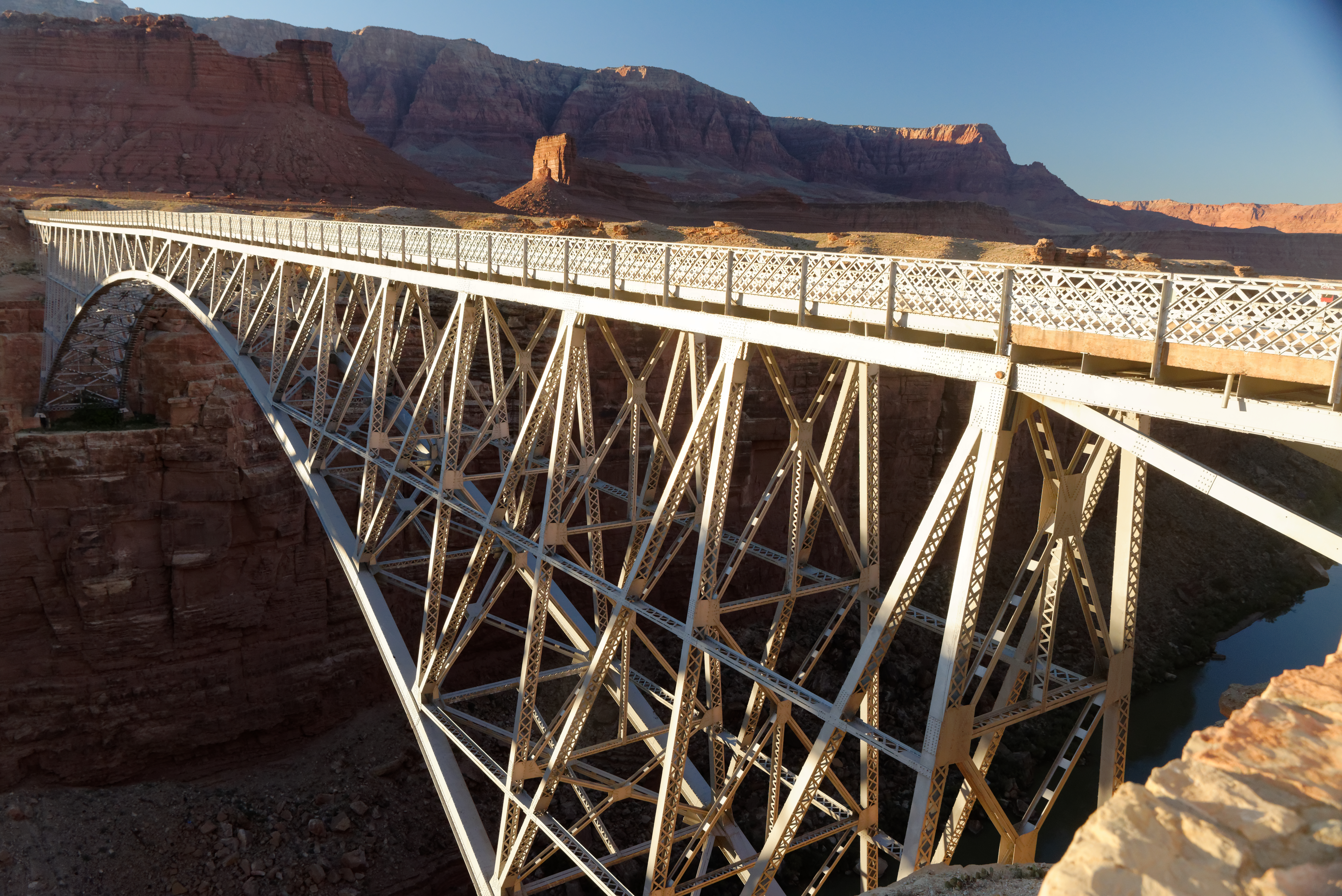
Cathedral Rock left of center (illuminated) above Navajo Bridge, Vermilion Cliffs National Monument further in the distance.

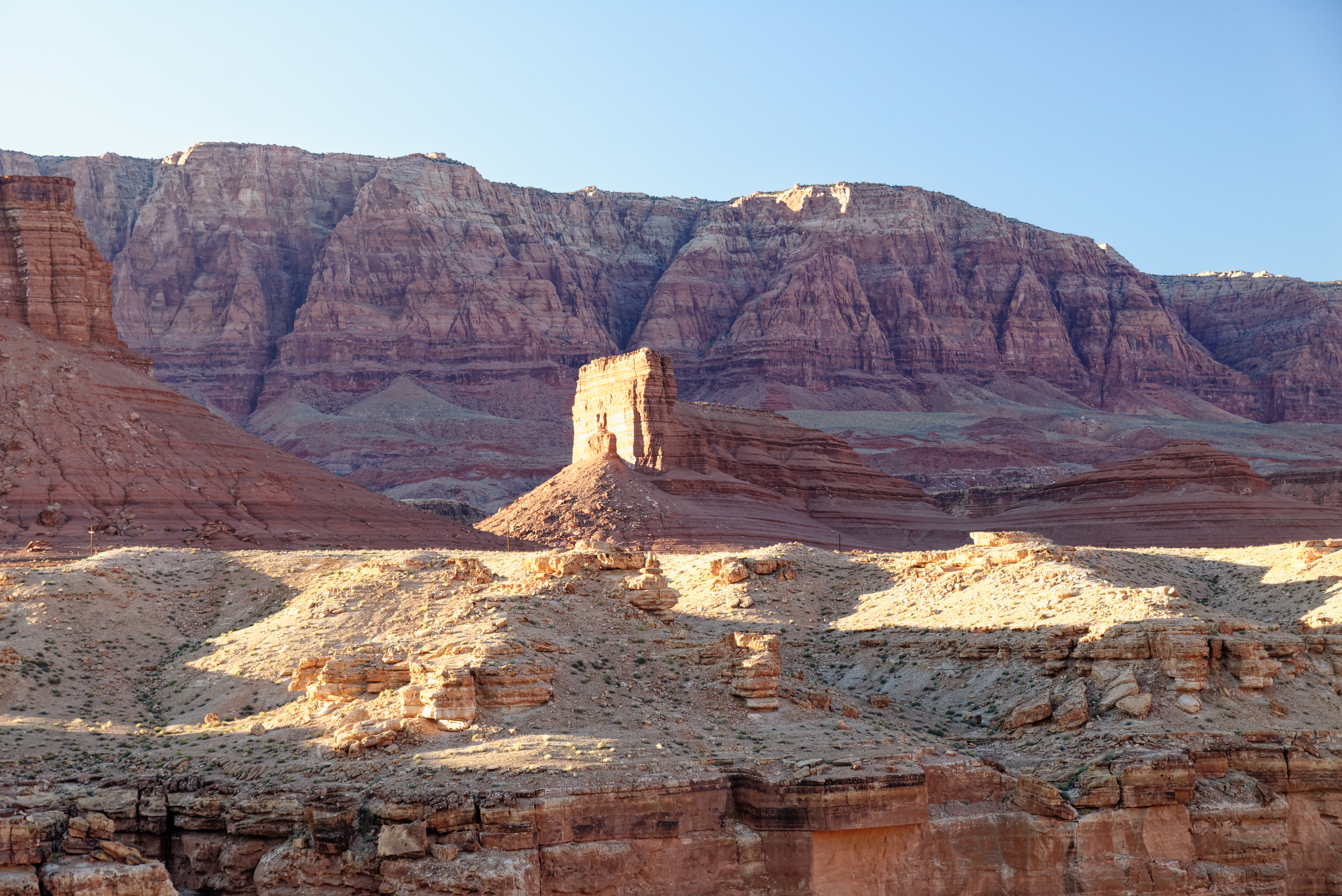
