= Cathedral Rock (Colorado) =

Rock formation located north of Colorado Springs

- Outcrop
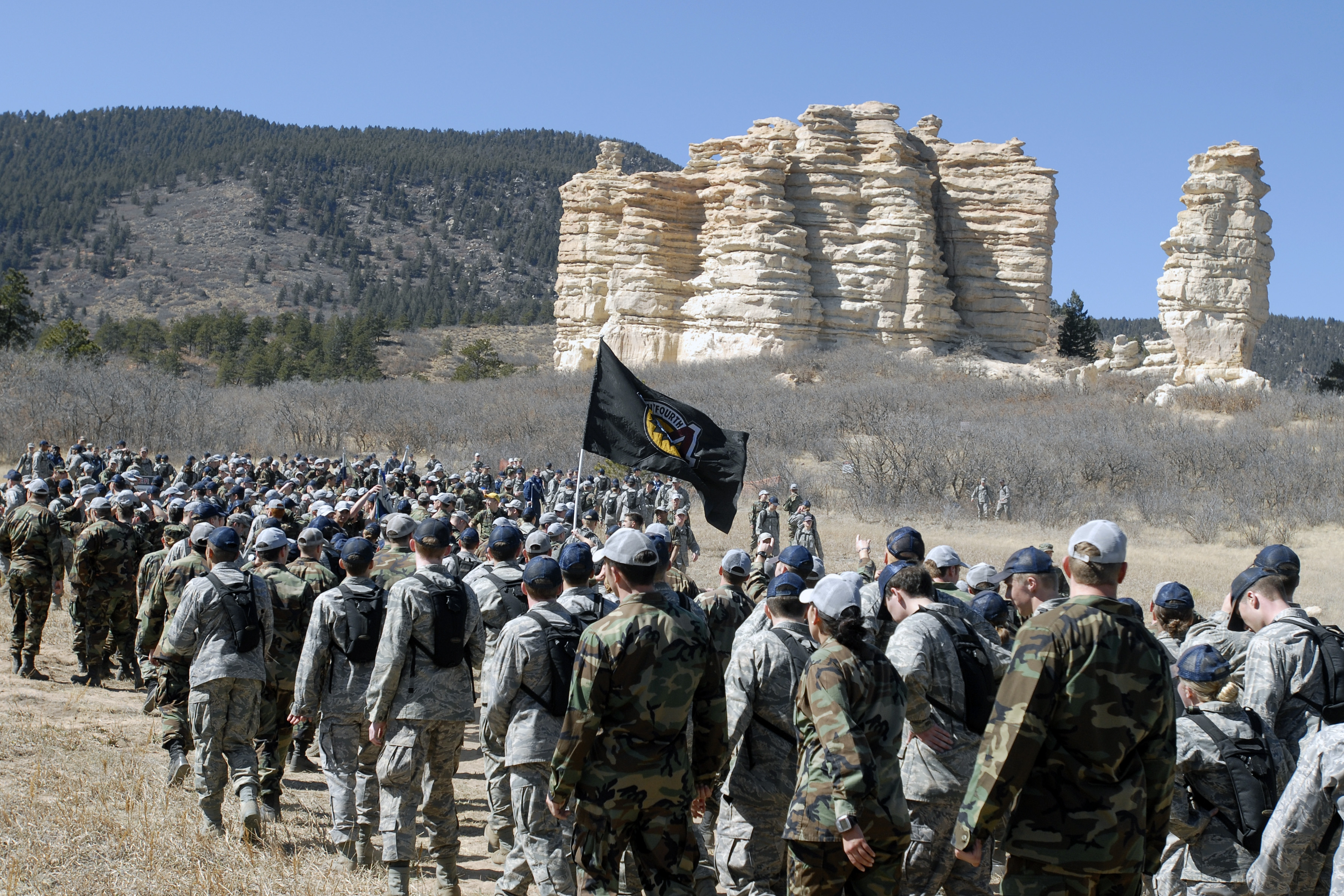
- Air Force Academy cadets at Cathedral Rock

- Location within Colorado
- Coordinates: 39°1′46″N 104°54′4.9″W
- Range: Rampart Range
- Elevation: 2,220 m (7,290 ft)
- Topo map: Palmer Lake

Cathedral Rock is a rock formation located north of Colorado Springs, Colorado on the U.S. Air Force Academy. The formation was part of the namesake Cathedral Rock Ranch, owned by Lawrence Lehman. Lehman sold the 4650 acre ranch, including Cathedral Rock, to the U.S. Air Force, and it became the first component of the U.S. Air Force Academy.

== Air Force Academy ==
Each year, the freshman class at the United States Air Force Academy run the five miles to Cathedral Rock as a symbolic end to Recognition, an institutional rite of passage.
