= Cathedral Mountain =

Cathedral Mountain may refer to:

- Cathedral Mountain (Australia), a mountain in Tasmania, Australia
- Cathedral Mountain (North Shore Mountains), one of the North Shore Mountains just outside Vancouver
- Cathedral Mountain (Yoho), a mountain in Yoho National Park, British Columbia
- Mount Meager (British Columbia), a mountain in southwestern British Columbia, Canada
- Cathedral Mountain (Texas), near Alpine
- Cathedral Mountain in Gloss Mountain State Park in Oklahoma.
- Cathedral Mountain (Zion), a mountain in Zion National Park, Utah
