= Cathedral Rock (New York) =

Mountain in New York, United States

- Location within New York Adirondack Park Location within the United States

Highest point
- Elevation: 1,725 feet (526 m)
- Coordinates: 44°09′14″N 74°54′56″W

Geography
- Location: St. Lawrence County, New York, U.S.

Cathedral Rock is a mountain in the Adirondack Mountains region of New York. It is located north of Wanakena in St. Lawrence County. The fire tower on Cathedral Rock was first constructed on Tooley Pond Mountain northwest of Cranberry Lake in 1919. The tower ceased fire lookout operations at the end of the 1971 season and was removed by students from the New York State College of Environmental Science and Forestry at Wanakena. Reconstruction of the tower began at Cathedral Rock in the 1980s, and was completed in 2000.

== History ==
The fire tower on Cathedral Rock was first built on Tooley Pond Mountain. The first structure built on Tooley Pond was a wooden tower that was built by the Conservation Commission (CC) in 1913. In 1919, the CC replaced it with a 47-foot-long (14 m) Aermotor LS40 tower. The tower ceased fire lookout operations at the end of the 1971 season.

The tower was removed from Tooley Pond Mountain by students from the New York State College of Environmental Science and Forestry at Wanakena in 1971. Reconstruction of the tower began at Cathedral Rock in the 1980s. The cab of the tower was finished in 1999. The windows and final restorations were complete in 2000, and was dedicated in July 2000.
