= Cathedral Rock (Washington) =

Mountain in Washington (state), United States

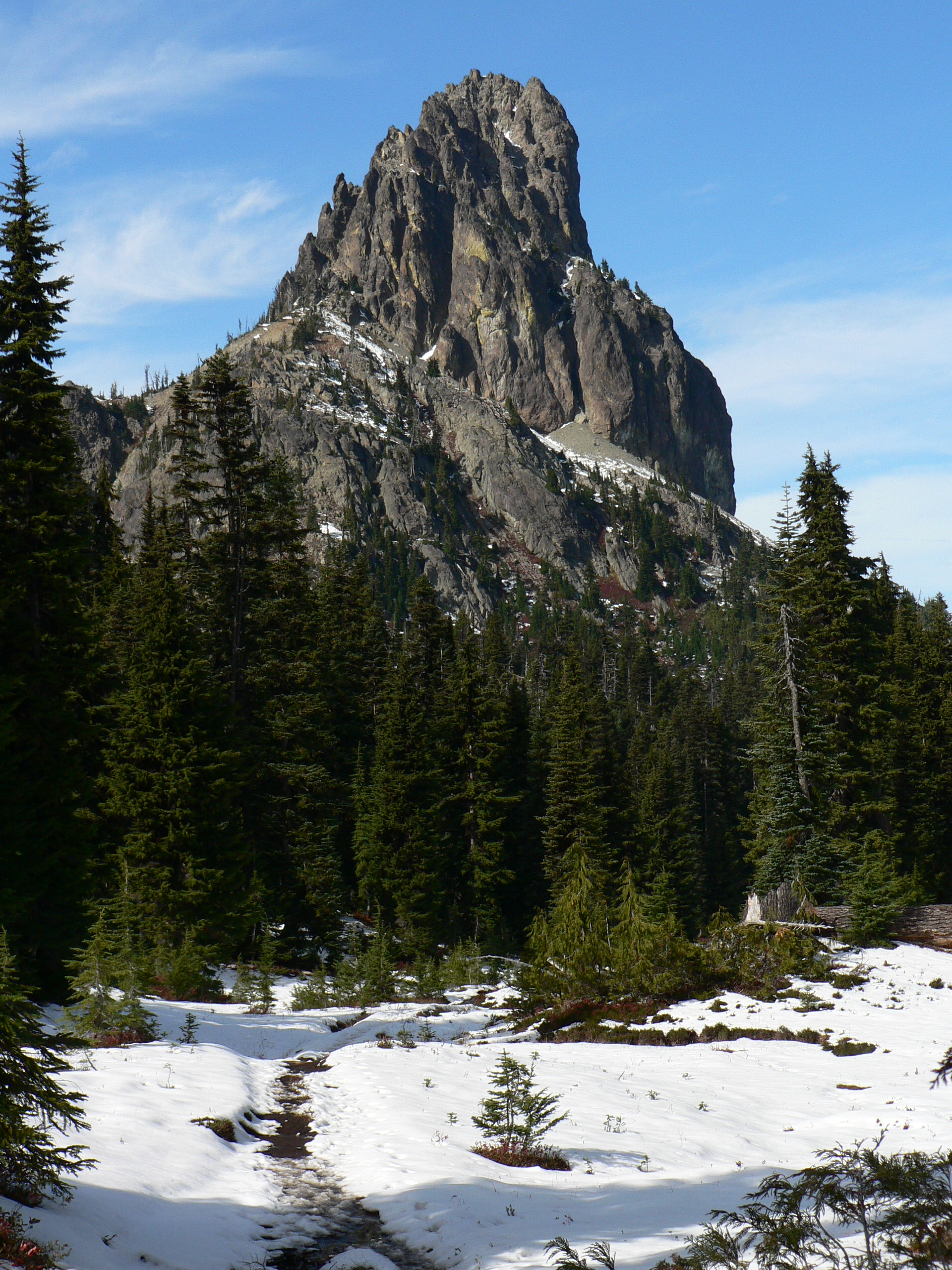
- Cathedral Rock

Highest point
- Elevation: 6,724 ft (2,049 m)
- Prominence: 1,084 ft (330 m)
- Isolation: 1.71 mi (2.75 km)
- Coordinates: 47°33′19″N 121°08′08″W

Geography
- Location within Washington (state) Location within the United States
- Country: United States
- State: Washington
- County: Kittitas
- Protected area: Alpine Lakes Wilderness
- Parent range: Cascade Range
- Topo map: USGS Mount Daniel

Geology
- Rock age: Oligocene
- Rock type: Andesite

Climbing
- First ascent: Between 1882-1896 by James Grieve
- Easiest route: class 3-4 scrambling

Cathedral Rock 6,724-foot (2,049-metre) mountain located in the Cascade Range, in Kittitas County of Washington state. It is situated within the Alpine Lakes Wilderness, on land managed by Wenatchee National Forest. Its nearest higher peak is The Citadel, 1.7 mi (2.7 km) to the southwest, and the dominant mountain in the area, Mount Daniel, rises 2.2 mi (3.5 km) to the west-northwest. Precipitation runoff from the peak drains into tributaries of the Yakima River.

== Climate ==
Cathedral Rock is located in the marine west coast climate zone of western North America. Weather fronts originating in the Pacific Ocean travel northeast toward the Cascade Mountains. As fronts approach, they are forced upward by the peaks of the Cascade Range, causing them to drop their moisture in the form of rain or snow onto the Cascades (Orographic lift). As a result, the west side of the Cascades experiences high precipitation, especially during the winter months in the form of snowfall. During winter months, weather is usually cloudy, but due to high pressure systems over the Pacific Ocean that intensify during summer months, there is often little or no cloud cover during the summer.

== Geology ==
Cathedral Rock is an intrusive andesite volcanic complex. The Alpine Lakes Wilderness features some of the most rugged topography in the Cascade Range with craggy peaks and ridges, deep glacial valleys, and granite walls spotted with over 700 mountain lakes. Geological events occurring many years ago created the diverse topography and drastic elevation changes over the Cascade Range leading to the various climate differences. These climate differences lead to vegetation variety defining the ecoregions in this area.

The history of the formation of the Cascade Mountains dates back millions of years ago to the late Eocene Epoch. With the North American Plate overriding the Pacific Plate, episodes of volcanic igneous activity persisted. In addition, small fragments of the oceanic and continental lithosphere called terranes created the North Cascades about 50 million years ago.

During the Pleistocene period dating back over two million years ago, glaciation advancing and retreating repeatedly scoured the landscape leaving deposits of rock debris. The last glacial retreat in the Alpine Lakes area began about 14,000 years ago and was north of the Canada–US border by 10,000 years ago. The U-shaped cross section of the river valleys is a result of that recent glaciation. Uplift and faulting in combination with glaciation have been the dominant processes which have created the tall peaks and deep valleys of the Alpine Lakes Wilderness area.

== Climbing Routes ==
Established climbing routes on Cathedral Rock:

- Southwest Face - class 3-4
- Northwest Couloir - class 3
- Southeast Face Chimney - class 5.6
- Northeast Buttress - class 5.7

== Gallery ==

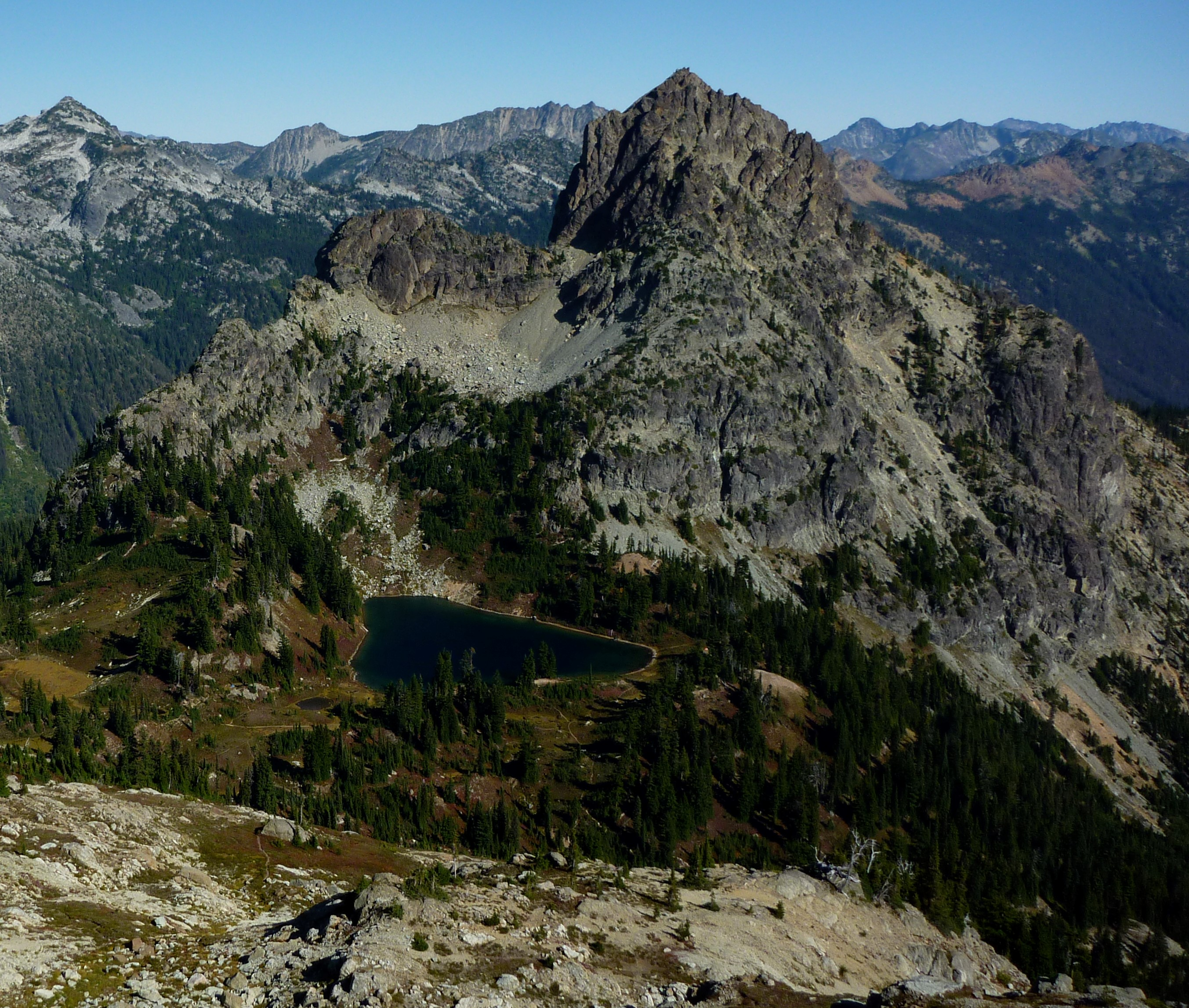
Peggys Pond and Cathedral Rock from Mt. Daniel

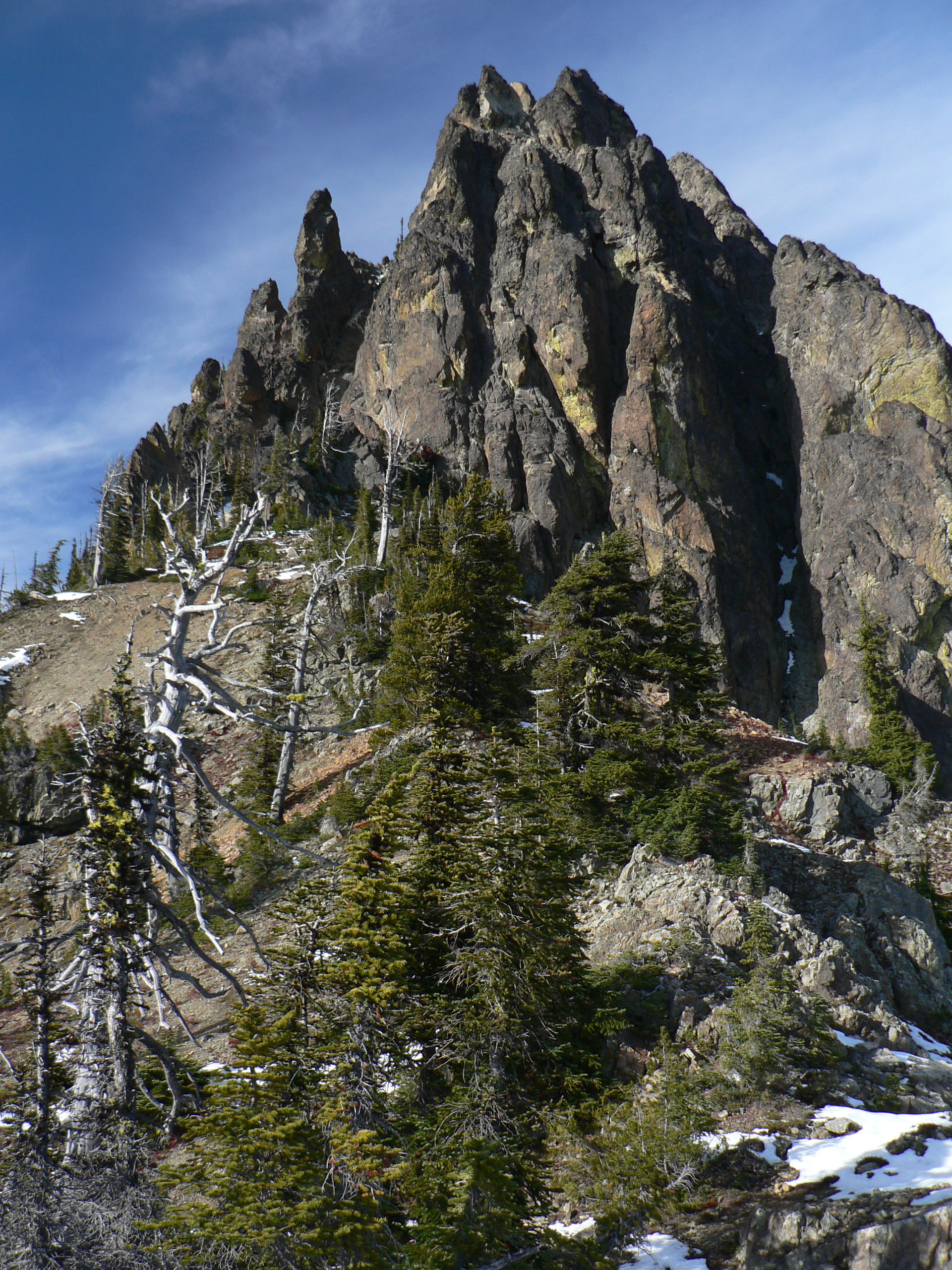
Cathedral Rock

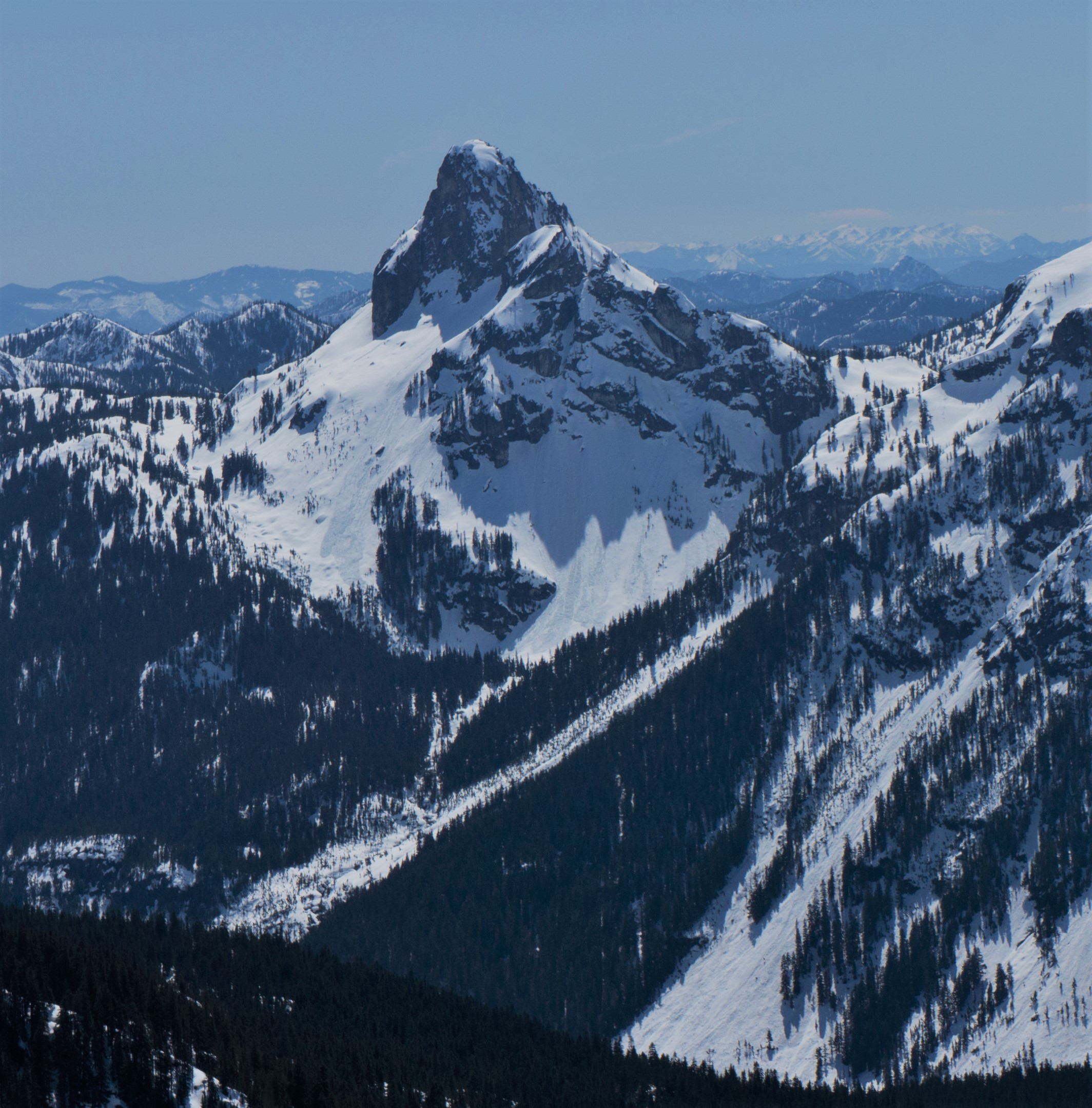
North aspect

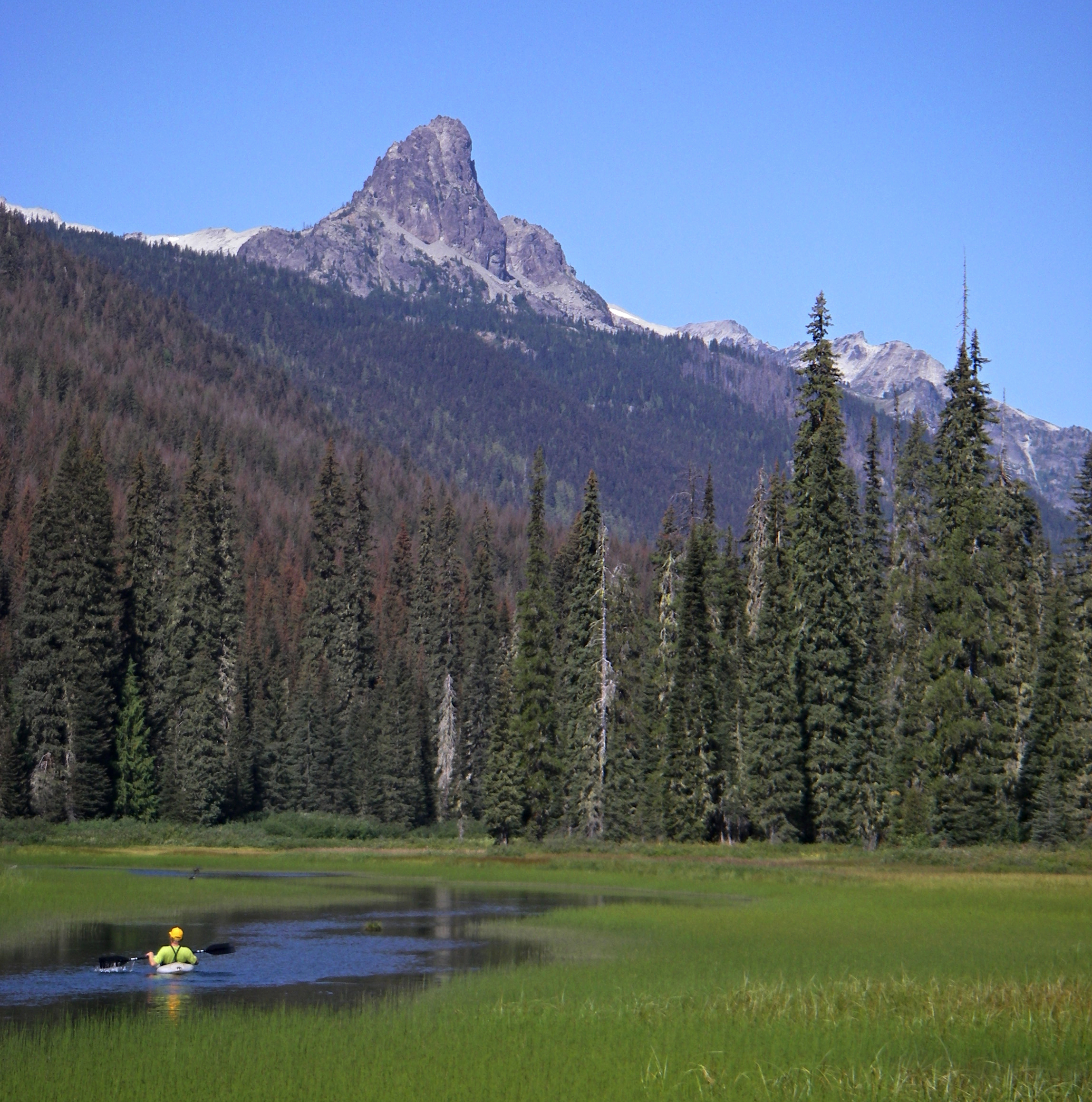

== See also ==
- List of peaks of the Alpine Lakes Wilderness
- Geography of Washington (state)
