= Waterfall Bluff =

Cliff in Eastern Cape, South Africa

- Interactive map of Waterfall Bluff
- Location: Cutwini, Lusikisiki, Eastern Cape, South Africa
- Coordinates: 31°26′01″S 29°49′20″E

Waterfall Bluff is an area of coastal steep cliffs in Lusikisiki Eastern Cape, South Africa, with natural features including Cathedral Rock. There are numerous seasonal waterfalls in the area which run directly into the Indian Ocean.
