= Cathedral Peak (Montrose County, Colorado) =

Mountain in the state of Colorado

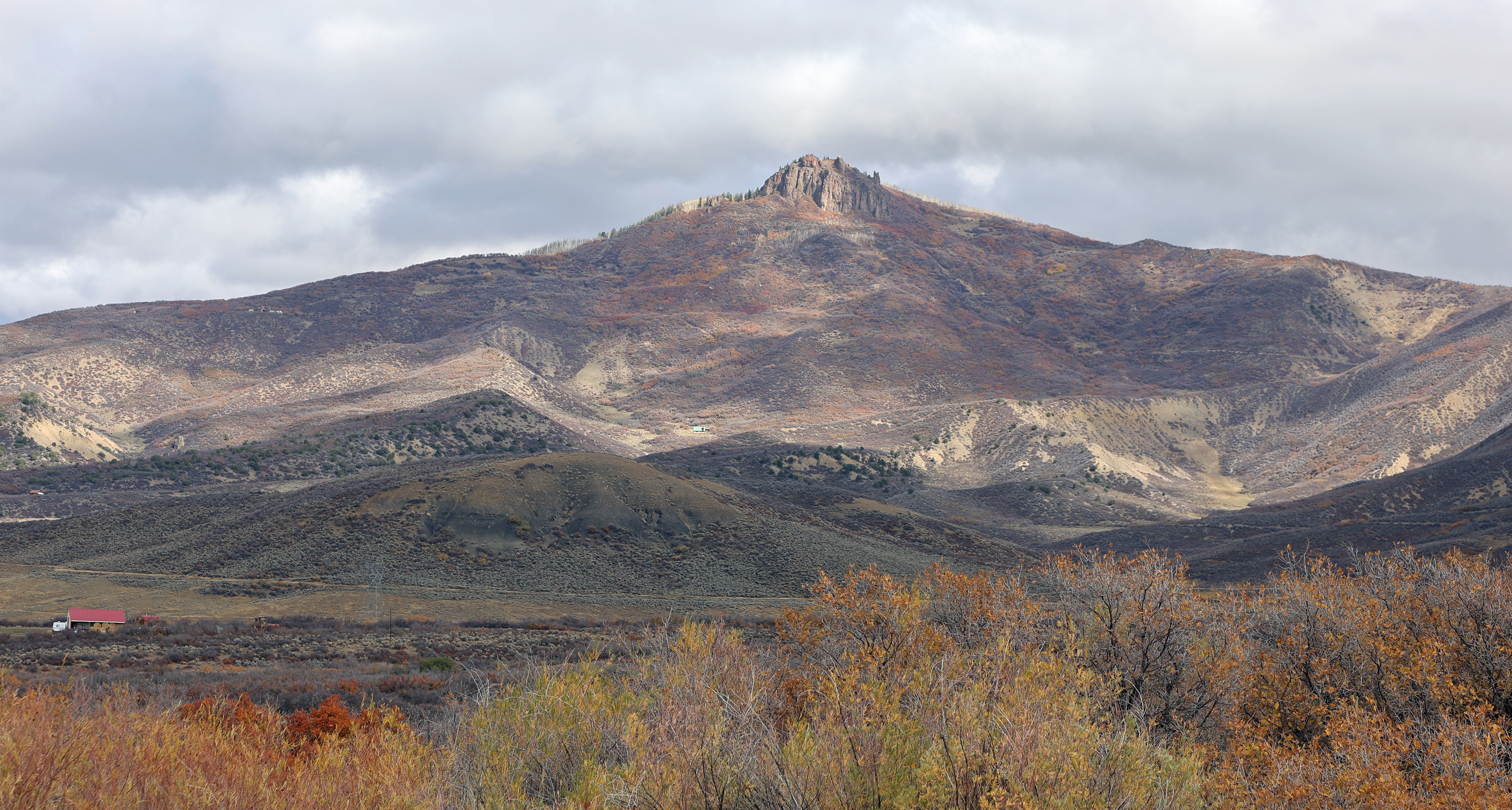
- The peak viewed from Colorado State Highway 92

Highest point
- Elevation: 9,634 ft (2,936 m)
- Prominence: 374 ft (114 m)
- Isolation: 4.3 mi (6.9 km)
- Coordinates: 38°35′12″N 107°30′44″W

Geography
- Location within Colorado
- Location: Montrose County, Colorado, U.S.
- Parent range: West Elk Mountains
- Topo map(s): USGS 7.5' topographic map Cathedral Peak

Cathedral Peak, elevation 9,634 feet (2,936 meters), is a summit in the West Elk Mountains in Montrose County, Colorado, U.S.

== Public lands ==
The peak is within the Gunnison National Forest.

== Geology ==
The mountain is made up of West Elk breccia.
