= Lynch Glacier =

Glacier in the state of Washington

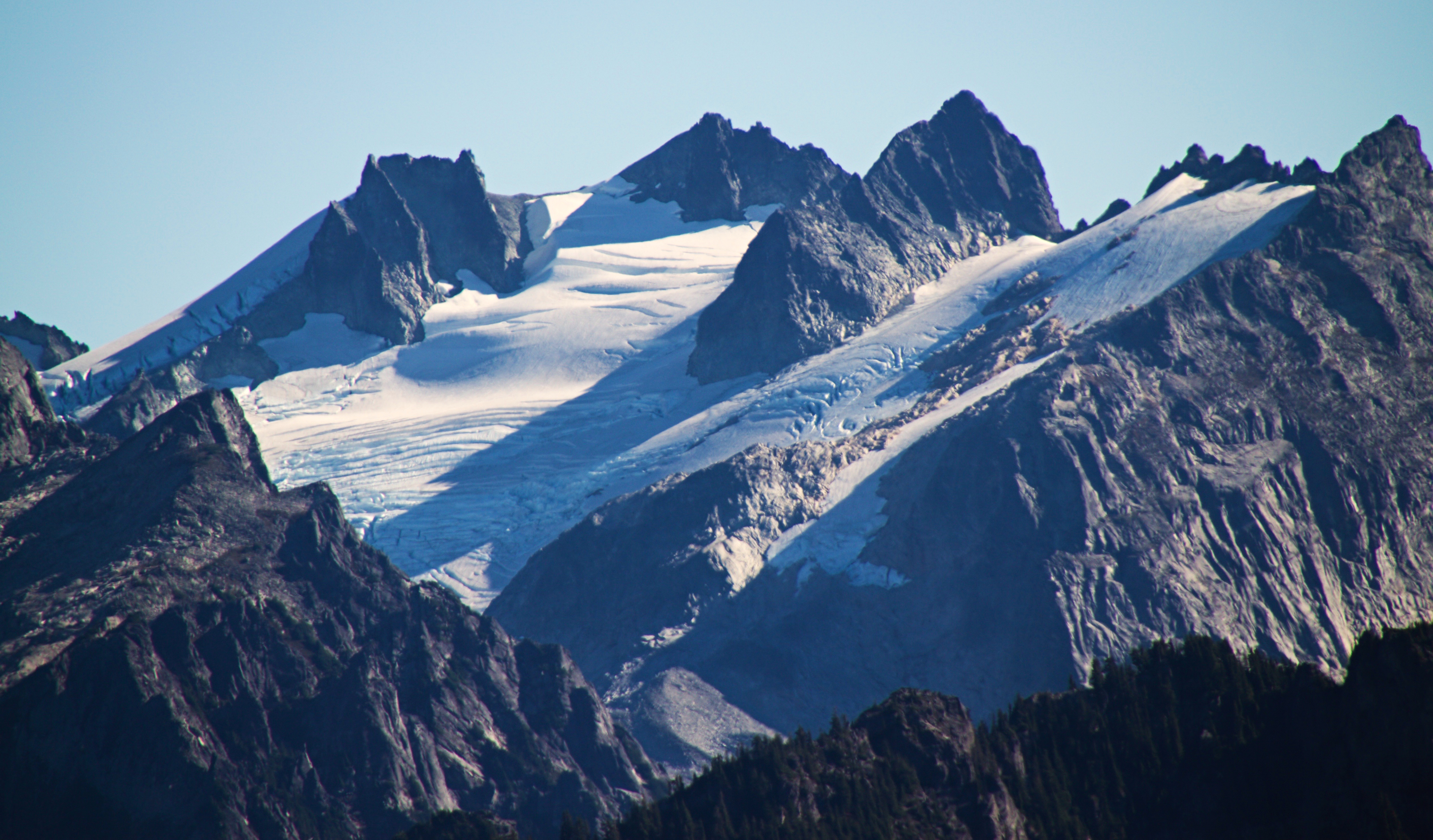
- Lynch Glacier on Mount Daniel

- Location within Washington (state)
- Type: Alpine glacier
- Location: Snoqualmie National Forest, King County, Washington, U.S.
- Coordinates: 47°34′20″N 121°10′50″W
- Length: .60 mi (0.97 km)
- Terminus: Icefall/proglacial lake
- Status: Retreating

Lynch Glacier lies to the north and northwest of Mount Daniel, in the U.S. state of Washington. Lynch Glacier is within the Alpine Lakes Wilderness of Snoqualmie National Forest. The glacier is approximately .60 mi (0.97 km) in length, .80 mi (1.29 km) in width at its widest and descends from 7,800 to 6,400 ft (2,400 to 2,000 m), where it terminates above a proglacial lake known as Pea Soup Lake. An arête divides the glacier into an eastern and western lobe, with the western section being the larger. In the late 1970s, Lynch Glacier extended into Pea Soup Lake; however, repeat photography indicates the glacier has since retreated above the lake.

== See also ==
- List of glaciers in the United States
