= Black Diamond =

Black Diamond(s) or The Black Diamond may refer to:

== Minerals ==
- Hematite
- Anthracite
- Carbonado, a black tinted natural diamond
- Boron carbide
- A black synthetic diamond, specifically CVD polycrystalline diamonds or HPHT polycrystalline compact diamonds

== Animals ==
- Black Diamond (buffalo) (born 1893), name of the North American bison featured on the reverse of the buffalo nickels circulated from 1913 to 1938
- Black Diamond (elephant) (1898–1929), Indian elephant

== Books ==
- The Black Diamond (novel), a 1921 British novel by Francis Brett Young
- Black Diamond: The Story of the Negro Baseball Leagues, a 1994 book by Patricia and Fredrick McKissack
- Black Diamonds: The Aboriginal and Islander Sports Hall of Fame, a 1996 book, incorporating the first round of the Aboriginal and Islander Sports Hall of Fame project

== Business and transportation ==
- Black Diamond (bus brand), a brand name used by Diamond Bus in the United Kingdom
- Black Diamond (custom car), winner of the 1978 Ridler Award
- Black Diamond (train), Reading RR-Lehigh Valley RR passenger train
- Black Diamond Cheese, a Canadian cheese manufacturing company
- Black Diamond Coal Mining Company, a coal mining company that operated in California, Oregon, and Washington
- Black Diamond Railroad, a planned railroad in Ohio
- Black Diamond Coal Mining Railroad, an abandoned railroad in California
- Black Diamond Equipment, a manufacturer of climbing and outdoor gear
- Black Diamond, a brand name used for various electrical products of the Mitsubishi Corporation
- Black Diamond, the barge whose collision with the steamer ship Massachusetts drowned at least 50 persons, including 4 pursuers of Abraham Lincoln's assassin
- Black Diamond switches, a switch series by Extreme Networks

== Films ==
- The Black Diamond (1922 film), a French silent mystery film
- The Black Diamond (1941 film), a French drama film
- Black Diamonds (1938 film), a Hungarian film directed by Ladislao Vajda
- Black Diamonds (1940 film), an American film directed by Christy Cabanne
- Diamantes Negros (2013 film), a Spanish-Malian film directed by Miguel Alcantud

== Music ==
- The Black Diamonds, an Australian garage-rock band

=== Albums ===
- Black Diamond (Angie Stone album), 1999
- Black Diamond (Buraka Som Sistema album), 2008
- Black Diamond (The Rippingtons album), 1997
- Black Diamond (Stan Ridgway album), 1995
- Black Diamond: The Anthology or the title song (see below), by Stratovarius, 2006
- Black Diamond, by The Groundhogs, 1976
- Black Diamond, by Janet Jackson, upcoming 2020
- Black Diamonds (EP) or the title song, by Issues, 2012

=== Songs ===
- "Black Diamond" (Bee Gees song), 1969
- "Black Diamond" (Kiss song), 1974
- "Black Diamond", by Double, 2008
- "Black Diamond", by Roy Brown, 1954
- "Black Diamond", by Stratovarius from Visions, 1997
- "Black Diamonds", by Therion, part of the "Draconian Trilogy" from Vovin, 1998

== Places ==
- Black Diamond (library), nickname of the modern extension of the Royal Danish Library, because of its appearance
- Black Diamond, Arizona, United States
- Black Diamond, Alberta, Canada
- Black Diamond, former name of Pittsburg, California, United States
- Black Diamond, Florida, United States
- Black Diamond, Washington, United States
- Black Diamond Mines Regional Preserve in California, United States, preserving historic coal mines

== Sports ==
=== People ===
- Austin Idol, professional wrestler, known as "Black Diamond" and other ring names
- Clinton Morrison (born 1979), Irish/English footballer, known as "Black Diamond"
- Leônidas da Silva, Brazilian footballer, known as "Black Diamond"

=== Other sports uses ===
- "Black Diamond" the Bison, mascot for Point Park University
- "Black Diamond", informal use for an inductee of the Aboriginal and Islander Sports Hall of Fame in Australia
- Black Diamond Australian Football League, an Australian rules football competition
- Black Diamond Conference, a high school conference of the Illinois High School Association
- A Black Diamond District, a high school conference of the Virginia High School League
- Black Diamond Trophy, a college football trophy that went to the winner of the annual West Virginia University and Virginia Tech football game
- Black diamond, a difficulty rating in Alpine skiing

== Other uses ==
- Black Diamond (roller coaster), a roller coaster in Elysburg, Pennsylvania, U.S.
- Black Diamonds (racial term), a derogatory term for wealthy black people in South Africa
- Black Diamond Apple, a variety of Huaniu apples that is cultivated in the Tibetan region of Nyingchi
