= Nortonville, California =

Nortonville
- Unincorporated community
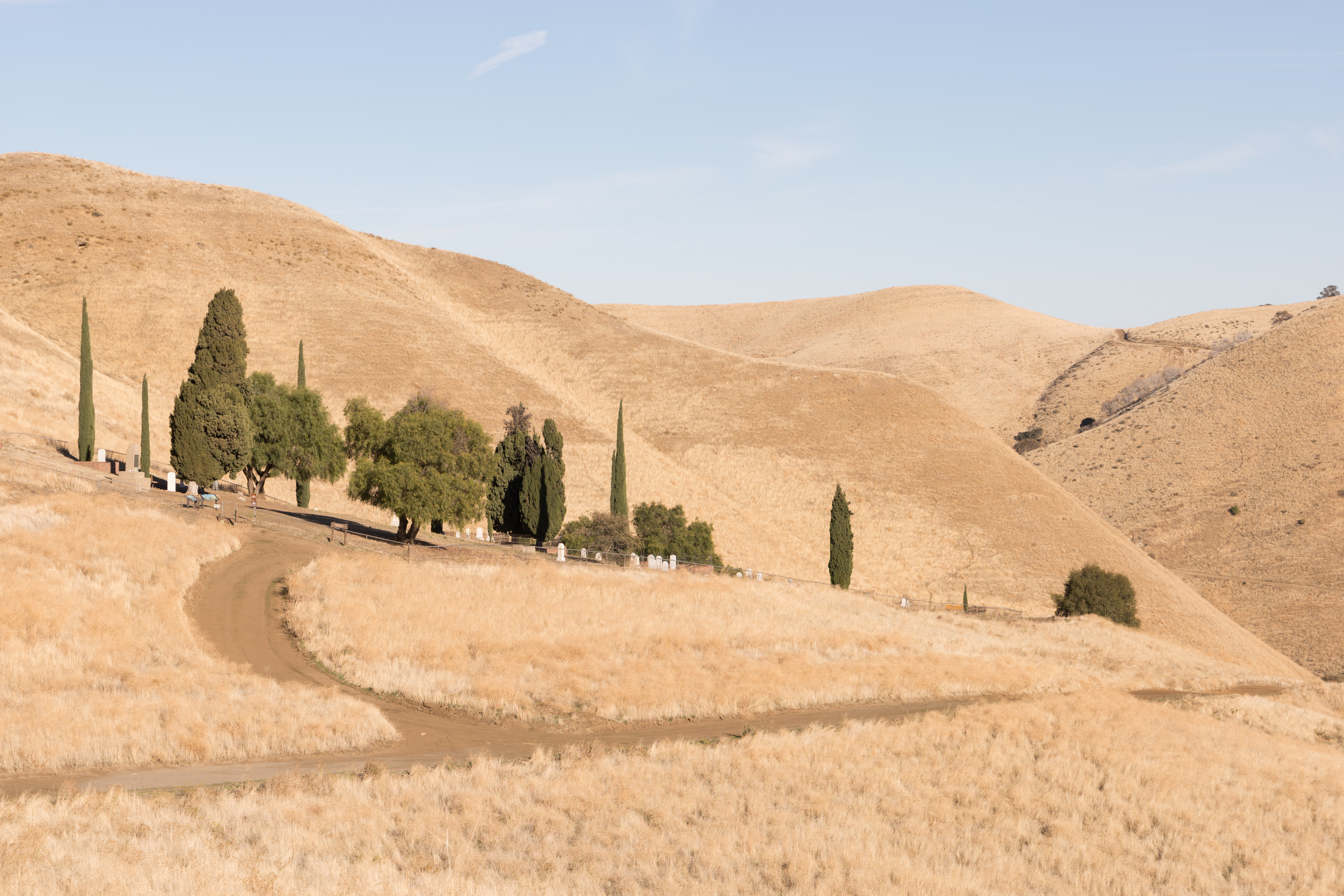
- Rose Hill Cemetery, near the former site of Nortonville

- Location in California Nortonville (the United States)
- Coordinates: 37°57′28″N 121°52′50″W
- Country: United States
- State: California
- County: Contra Costa
- Established: 1861
- Elevation: 801 ft (244 m)

Nortonville was an unincorporated town in eastern Contra Costa County, California, United States that is now considered a ghost town. It was one of five towns established within the Mount Diablo Coalfield, along with Somersville, Stewartville, Judsonville, and West Hartley. Nortonville was established in 1861 by Noah Norton. The town's population rapidly rose due to the opening of the nearby Black Diamond Mine, which attracted coal miners and their families. Activity peaked in 1882, after which the local coal mines closed down and the town quickly became deserted. The former town site is located on Nortonville Road and Black Diamond Trail, just south of the city of Pittsburg. The town site is now part of the Black Diamond Mines Regional Preserve, managed by the East Bay Regional Park District.

== Geography ==
Nortonville was located along Kirker Creek, 5.5 miles (9 km) north-northeast of Mount Diablo, at an elevation of 801 feet (244 m). It was situated between Kirker Pass and Nortonville Pass, among rugged hills characterized by narrow valleys and ravines. The surrounding landscape consists of grasslands, chaparral, mixed evergreen forest, and foothill woodland, atypical of the Sacramento-San Joaquin River Delta region. Typical vegetation includes Coulter pine, foothill pine, blue oak, black sage, desert olive, dudleya, bush poppy, Fremont globe mallow, mountain mahogany, Mount Diablo globe lily, and Mount Diablo manzanita. The former town site is also home to several exotic plant species introduced by past residents, such as black locust, almond, cypress, pepper tree, eucalyptus, and tree of heaven. Common wildlife include coyotes, rattlesnakes, mountain lions, foxes, bobcats, raccoons, and rabbits.

== History ==
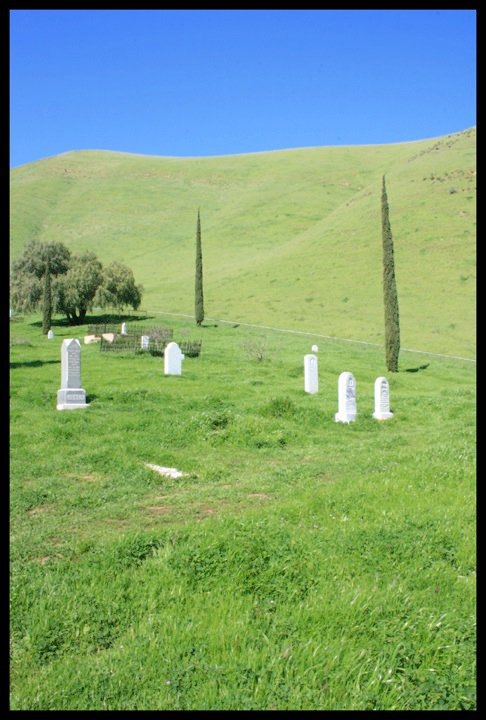
Rose Hill Cemetery, in the East Bay Regional Park District's Black Diamond Mines Regional Preserve, CA.

=== Etymology ===
Nortonville is named after Noah Norton, co-founder and operator of the nearby Black Diamond coal mine. In 1861 he built the first house in what would become the town of Nortonville.

=== Discovery of coal ===
William C. Israel discovered a coal vein at Horse Haven, about 6 miles (10 km) south of Antioch, in 1859. News of this discovery brought disillusioned gold seekers to the area to begin prospecting for coal. In March 1855 George W. Hawxhurst discovered the Union vein of coal near what would later become Somersville. On December 22, 1859 Francis Somers and James T. Cruikshank discovered the rich Black Diamond vein of coal near Kirker Creek.

The Black Diamond Mine was opened in 1860 by Noah Norton, C.I. Cutler, Mr. Matheson, and Josiah Sturges, with Noah Norton overseeing operations. The Black Diamond Coal Mining Company was established in June 1861 to manage this mine. The Cumberland and Mount Hope mines were also opened nearby, initially operated by the short-lived Peacock and San Francisco companies and later purchased by the Black Diamond Coal Mining Company.

The main shaft at Black Diamond Mine was approximately 750 feet (229 m) deep, and up to 600 tons of coal was extracted each day. At the height of operations, around 1,000 men were employed to work the mines around Nortonville and Somersville. They were paid three dollars a day. Jobs included miners, underground foremen, coal cutters, railroad men, carpenters, blacksmiths, drivers, firemen, and watchmen. The passages and rooms of the mines were very narrow and often required miners to lie on their side as they worked. The coal would be shoveled into railroad cars that were then pushed by hand to the mine entrance.

Work in the mines was dangerous. The most fatal incident occurred on July 24, 1876, when an explosion at the Black Diamond Mine set coal dust on fire, trapping several men within the burning tunnels. Eleven miners were killed in the initial explosion or in the days following as they succumbed to severe burns, with many others injured. Most of the victims were buried in Rose Hill Cemetery.

Nortonville was the southern terminus of the six mile long Black Diamond Coal Mining Railroad (also known as the "Black Diamond Railroad"), built in 1868. The railroad connected Nortonville with the San Joaquin River, at Black Diamond Landing, California, with a stop at Cornwall, California (the latter two towns are now a part of the city of Pittsburg).

Although the coal found in this region was said to be relatively low-quality lignite, brittle, and easily crumbled into dust when exposed to air, its discovery came at an opportune time as the population of the state was quickly growing due to the California gold rush and importation of foreign fuel sources was cost-prohibitive. Coal from the Mount Diablo Coal Field became the leading supplier of fuel for the San Francisco Bay Area by 1868.

=== Growth ===
The opening of the nearby mines attracted many men to the area for employment. Miners came from Wales, England, Ireland, Italy, Australia, Canada, China, Germany, Mexico, Austria, Scotland, and Sweden, as well as from the coal fields of Pennsylvania. They settled near Black Diamond Mine, forming the town of Nortonville. The town had a particularly large population of Welsh immigrants.

The Black Diamond Hotel was opened in 1863, and Joel Clayton (namesake of nearby Clayton, California) began operating a store in town in 1865. A local cemetery was also established that year, known as the "Rose Hill Cemetery," which was named for Emma Rose, daughter of Alvinza Hayward, who was president and chief stockholder of the Black Diamond Coal Mining Company. The first school was opened in 1866 by D. S. Woodruff. By 1870, there were three hotels, three general merchandise stores, four boardinghouses, six saloons, and a livery stable. The population at that time was just over 500 people, making Nortonville the largest town in Contra Costa County. The population of Nortonville peaked in 1882 at about 900 residents, about 300 of which were men employed by the mines.

A post office operated at Nortonville from 1874 to 1910, with closures in 1887 and from 1890 to 1891.

=== Daily life ===
By the 1870s Nortonville had become the main center of social and business activities for the surrounding communities. Several fraternal organizations and social clubs were established, including the Independent Order of Knights of Plythias, International Order of Good Templars, Independent Order of Odd Fellows, Free and Accepted Masons, Ancient Order of United Workmen, Grand Army of the Republic, and Sons of Temperance. The town also hosted a Women's Suffrage Society, two Welsh literary societies, a Dramatic Society, Baseball Club, Glee Club, and brass band.

Men not employed in the mines worked as farmers, fishermen, barbers, blacksmiths, carpenters, cooks, butchers, teachers, clerks, shoemakers, ministers, doctors, bookkeepers, store owners, and saloon operators. Many also took on public service roles such as constable, sheriff, or justice of the peace. Several were employed by canneries, steel plants, and lumberyards in the nearby cities of Antioch and New York Landing (later known as Black Diamond, now Pittsburg).

Women worked as teachers, hotel proprietors, postmistresses, and domestic help. Sarah Norton, wife of Noah Norton, was a well-respected midwife who was said to have attended the births of over 600 babies, all successfully. She was killed on October 5, 1879 when a runaway horse caused her to be thrown from her cart while on her way to attend a birth. She is buried in Rose Hill Cemetery.

Nortonville's public schools were said to be among the best in the county, owing to heavy local tax support. The local coal companies had an agreement with those working in the mines that workers would contribute fifty cents for every $100 earned to the local school fund. A night school was also established in order to accommodate young men working the mines during school hours.

Typical recreational activities included picnics, dances, socials, baseball games, musical performances, hunting trips, May Day celebrations, and Independence Day events. As many residents were Welsh or of Welsh descent the town often hosted celebrations of traditional Welsh holidays such as Eisteddfod, a festival which included competitions in singing and readings of prose and poetry.

=== Decline ===
By the mid-1880s improvements in mining techniques and transportation made it more economical to import high-grade coal from foreign sources, as well from as the newly opened coalfields in Oregon and Washington Territory. Additionally, alternative fuel sources, such as oil, had come to fulfill a higher proportion of the Bay Area's industrial power needs.

The most easily mined materials in the Mount Diablo Coalfield had been removed by this point, with some mines going as deep as 700 feet (213 m). The Black Diamond Mine was so deep that it acted as a drain for the surrounding mines, and when the owners of the other mines refused to contribute to the cost of pumping out the water, the company simply shut down operations. In 1885 the Black Diamond Coal Mining Company moved all of their coal miners from Nortonville to another of the Company's mines at Black Diamond, Washington Territory, taking nearly all equipment with them and removing the railroad near Nortonville.

The population of Nortonville rapidly declined in the course of just a few months. The Contra Costa Gazette described the state of the town on October 10, 1885:

It is sad to visit a town in the throes of dissolution that so short a time ago was so proud and prosperous as Nortonville was....The few inhabitants still remaining are hopelessly stranded, with no possibility of relief, else they too would quietly steal away...Some of the more fortunate, who have snatched a few dimes from dame fortune, are able to wash the grim and black coal dust from their faces, and are taking their houses to pieces, moving to greener pastures and rebuilding. And yet it is a sad sight to witness this decay and dissolution of a town once so proud and prosperous.

Most of the remaining residents moved to the nearby towns of Antioch and Black Diamond, constructing new homes there with lumber salvaged from Nortonville. Those that remained near Nortonville transitioned to cattle ranching, with abandoned buildings, equipment, and railroad ties being converted to serve this purpose.

Other towns in the Mount Diablo Coalfield, such as Somersville, fared somewhat better as their principal mines continued to operate for several years. However, by 1902 the last coal mine in the region had ceased operations and was closed. The Black Diamond Mine was briefly reopened during World War I and World War II, with a few hundred tons of coal per year being mined on a contract basis. The U.S. Bureau of Mines conducted test drillings in January 1949 to locate the Black Diamond and Clark veins and possibly restart mining operations, but ultimately this did not occur.

=== Sand mine ===
In 1922 the Columbia Steel Corporation began underground mining of silica sand at a site near Nortonville, producing sand that was used for local casting and glass-making. The Roberts Sand Company took over operations in the 1930s. Competition from Belgian glass sand and other imports grew over the course of the next decade, causing the Nortonville sand mine to cease operations in 1949. It is estimated that 367,543 tons of sand, valued at $1.3 million, was extracted from the Nortonville site.

=== Ghost town and regional preserve ===
The Nortonville town site has remained deserted since coal mining operations ceased. From 1950 to 1974 the former town site and surrounding lands were used for cattle grazing. Any remaining buildings were dismantled for parts or burned down. The only structures that remain today are the brick foundation of the mine's hoisting works, remnants of the railroad bed, and the nearby Rose Hill Cemetery. The cemetery was donated to Contra Costa County in the 1940s by Emma Rose.

In 1973 the East Bay Regional Park District acquired the land that includes the Nortonville and Somersville town sites, as well as Rose Hill Cemetery, from the Southport Land and Commercial Company (formerly the Black Diamond Coal Mining Company). Several years were spent sealing the mines to ensure they would not pose a safety hazard to visitors. Black Diamond Mines Regional Preserve opened to the public on May 8, 1976. The East Bay Regional Park District acquired an additional 176.18 acres of neighboring land in December 1980, which included more of the former Nortonville town site.

From 1978 to 1988 Black Diamond Mines Regional Preserve hosted Black Diamond Days, an annual celebration of the history and culture of Nortonville and the surrounding coal mining communities. The popular event attracted thousands of visitors each year and included oral history forums featuring former residents of Nortonville. As of 2009, descendants of the former Nortonville and Somersville residents held biannual reunion picnics in May. Many former residents and their descendants have donated papers, artifacts, and photographs from their time living in Nortonville to the Black Diamond Mines Regional Preserve, where they are cared for in the park's archives.

== In popular culture ==
- In 1978 the Oakland Museum of California featured the history of Nortonville in an exhibit titled "Welsh Miners and Black Diamonds."
- The Green Age of Asher Witherow, a novel by M. Allen Cunningham published in 2004, takes place in Nortonville in the 1860s-1870s.
- In the Shadow of Diablo, a historical fiction book series by Dan Hanel, includes several mentions of Nortonville.
- The former townsite and nearby Rose Hill Cemetery have been the subject of alleged ghost sightings, including the White Witch of Nortonville, thought to be Sarah Norton (wife of founder Noah Norton) or a woman named Mary.
