= Stewartville, California =

Stewartville
- Unincorporated community
- Location in California Stewartville (the United States)
- Coordinates: 37°56′47″N 121°50′55″W
- Country: United States
- State: California
- County: Contra Costa
- Elevation: 560 ft (170 m)

Stewartville (sometimes spelled Stewartsville) was an unincorporated place in eastern Contra Costa County, California, United States that is now a ghost town. It was located 6 miles (10 km) northeast of Mount Diablo, at an elevation of 558 feet (170 m). It was a mining town for the nearby Central coal mine, with a population of nearly 300 residents at its height of activity in the 1870s. It was one of five towns that comprised the Mount Diablo Coalfield, along with Nortonville, Somersville, Judsonville, and West Hartley.

The town was named for William B. Stewart, who purchased nearby Stewart's Mine (later named the Central Mine) and operated it until 1876. A post office operated at Stewartville from 1882 to 1902.

The former Stewartville townsite is now part of the Black Diamond Mines Regional Preserve, managed by the East Bay Regional Park District, which hosts group and backpacking camp sites nearby.
