= The Green Age of Asher Witherow =

2004 novel by M. Allen Cunningham

- First edition cover
- Author: M. Allen Cunningham
- Publisher: Unbridled Books
- Publication date: October 7, 2004
- ISBN: 1-932961-00-3

The Green Age of Asher Witherow is the debut novel of M. Allen Cunningham, published in 2004. It is the story of Asher Witherow, a boy born in the coal mining town of Nortonville, California in 1863. The story is framed as a memoir, penned by the elderly Witherow in the spring of 1950, long after the book's events occurred, and many years after the community of Nortonville ceased to exist. Witherow, a mysterious and haunted old man of 86, shares the troubling story of his life from birth to age 20, when he left Nortonville. Central to the tale is the image of the 4,000 foot Mount Diablo, which assumes a symbolic presence for Witherow. The book's title is inspired by the poem "The Force That Through the Green Fuse Drives the Flower" by Dylan Thomas, which begins, "The force that through the green fuse drives the flower / Drives my green age; that blasts the roots of trees / Is my destroyer."

The poem's central themes of mortality, biological decay, and ecological interdependence are explored in the novel.

== See also ==
- Black Diamond Mines Regional Preserve
