= Hesperolinon adenophyllum =

Conservation status
- Imperiled (NatureServe)

Scientific classification
- Kingdom: Plantae
- Clade: Tracheophytes
- Clade: Angiosperms
- Clade: Eudicots
- Clade: Rosids
- Order: Malpighiales
- Family: Linaceae
- Genus: Hesperolinon
- Species: H. adenophyllum

Binomial name
- Hesperolinon adenophyllum (A. Gray) Small

Species of flowering plant

Hesperolinon adenophyllum is a rare species of flowering plant in the flax family known by the common names glandular dwarf flax and glandular western flax. It is endemic to California, where most known occurrences have been recorded in Lake and Mendocino Counties. It is generally found in chaparral ecosystems on serpentine soils. This is an annual herb growing erect to heights between 10 and 50 centimeters. Its narrow, lance-shaped leaves are lined with rows of teeth with large knobby glandular points. The flower has small sepals speckled with glandular hairs and five thin yellow petals. The stamens protrude from the face of the flower and hold large yellow anthers.
