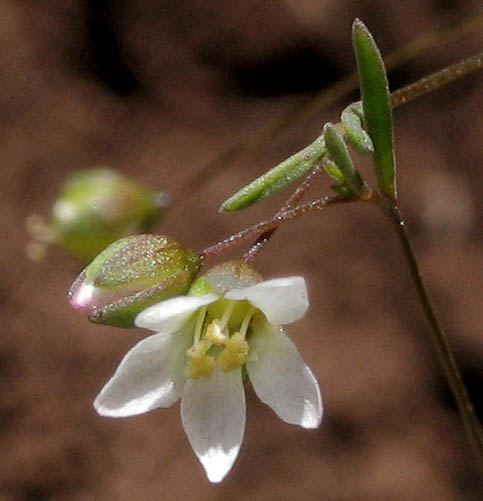

Scientific classification
- Kingdom: Plantae
- Clade: Tracheophytes
- Clade: Angiosperms
- Clade: Eudicots
- Clade: Rosids
- Order: Malpighiales
- Family: Linaceae
- Genus: Hesperolinon
- Species: H. micranthum

Binomial name
- Hesperolinon micranthum (Gray) Small

= Hesperolinon micranthum =

Species of flowering plant

Hesperolinon micranthum is a species of flowering plant in the flax family known by the common name smallflower dwarf flax. It is native to the west coast of North America from Oregon to Baja California. It may occur in Nevada. It grows in a number of open habitats, often on serpentine soils. This is a spindly annual herb producing a very thin stem 5 to 20 centimeters in height. Its small, sparse leaves are linear in shape. The tiny flowers have five white or pink-veined white petals each less than four millimeters long and protruding stamens with white or purple anthers.
