= Hesperolinon californicum =

Scientific classification
- Kingdom: Plantae
- Clade: Tracheophytes
- Clade: Angiosperms
- Clade: Eudicots
- Clade: Rosids
- Order: Malpighiales
- Family: Linaceae
- Genus: Hesperolinon
- Species: H. californicum

Binomial name
- Hesperolinon californicum (Benth.) Small

Species of flowering plant

Hesperolinon californicum is a species of flowering plant in the flax family known by the common name California dwarf flax. It is endemic to California, where it grows in the coastal mountains and hills surrounding the San Francisco Bay Area and some of the foothills of the Sierra Nevada. It is found in grassland and chaparral ecosystems, often on serpentine soils. This is an annual herb growing erect to 10 to 25 centimeters in height. It has thin, narrow to threadlike leaves and produces a red exudate from resin glands located at the base of leaf petioles. The inflorescence holds several flowers with glandular sepals and five white to pink-tinged petals. The protruding stamens are tipped with large pink anthers.
