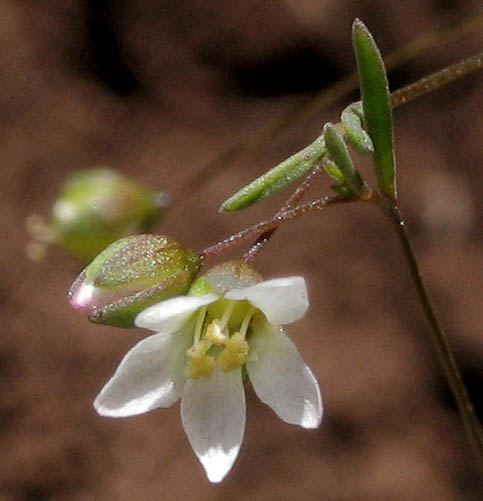
- Hesperolinon micranthum

Scientific classification
- Kingdom: Plantae
- Clade: Tracheophytes
- Clade: Angiosperms
- Clade: Eudicots
- Clade: Rosids
- Order: Malpighiales
- Family: Linaceae
- Subfamily: Linoideae
- Genus: Hesperolinon (Gray) Small

Species
- 13, see text

= Hesperolinon =

Genus of flowering plants

Hesperolinon is a genus in the family Linaceae, whose common genus names are dwarf-flax or western flax, in reference to their distribution along the west coast of North America. There are 13 known species within this genus of wildflowers, most of which are limited to serpentine soil habitats within California, United States. These annual plants are thought to be mostly self-pollinating.

== Description ==
Stems vary between five and fifty centimeters in length, with thread-like to linear leaves generally alternate: the leaves are typically not planar and not clasping. Cymes are characteristically open and pedicels are somewhat thread-like and ascending. The flower has five sepals, whose margins may be minutely gland-toothed. Five petals are widely spreading between one and twelve millimeters in dimension. These yellow, white or rose colored petals each manifest three minute scales at the inner base. There are five stamens and four to six ovary chambers; styles number two to three. Fruits have a smooth surface exterior.

== History ==
Hesperolinon was originally classified as a section of Linum in 1865. In 1907, it was separated into its own genus under Linaceae, where it remains as of May 2025.

Sclerolinon digynum was classified under Hesperolinon from 1887 until 1966, when C. M. Rogers reclassified it under its current monotypic genus (Sclerolinon).

== Species ==
- Hesperolinon adenophyllum - glandular western flax
- Hesperolinon bicarpellatum - bicarpellate western flax
- Hesperolinon breweri - Brewer's western flax
- Hesperolinon californicum - California western flax
- Hesperolinon clevelandii - Allen Springs dwarf flax
- Hesperolinon congestum - Marin western flax
- Hesperolinon didymocarpum - Lake County western flax
- Hesperolinon disjunctum - Coast Range western flax
- Hesperolinon drymarioides - drymary western flax
- Hesperolinon micranthum - smallflower western flax
- Hesperolinon serpentinum
- Hesperolinon sharsmithiae - Sharsmith's western flax
- Hesperolinon spergulinum - slender western flax
- Hesperolinon tehamense - Paskenta Grade western flax, Tehama western flax
