= Southport, Oregon =

- Unincorporated community
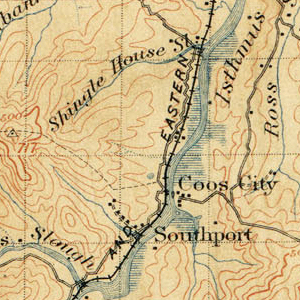
- 1896 USGS Topographic Map

- Location in the state of Oregon
- Coordinates: 43°17′53″N 124°13′13″W
- Country: United States
- County: Coos County
- Established: 1877
- Elevation: 30 ft (9 m)

Southport is an unincorporated locale in Coos County, Oregon, United States. It was located along Southport Creek, near where the creek flows into Isthmus Slough, 6.5 miles (10 km) south of the city of Coos Bay, at an elevation of 30 feet (9 m). The former community is now a ghost town.

== Location ==
The Southport town site is located on Southport Lane, off of US Highway 101, south of the city of Coos Bay in Coos County.

== History ==
Sometime between 1875 and 1877 B. B. Jones opened a coal mine named the Southport Mine, and the village of Southport sprang up next to the mine. It was a company town of the Black Diamond Coal Mining Company, headquartered in San Francisco, California. (Nortonville, California and Black Diamond, Washington, were two of the company's other towns.)

In 1882 the town had a population of 100, with a general merchandise store, a variety store, and a hotel/saloon. A 2,000-foot-long makeshift railroad ran from the mine to the slough.

Southport never had a post office; instead it was served by the post office at Coos City (also now a ghost town), which was located on the other side of Isthmus Slough from Southport.

In 1885, the Black Diamond Coal Mining Company opened a new mine at Black Diamond, Washington, and many of the miners at Southport and Nortonville moved to the new mine.

In about 1885, the owners of a competing mine, the Newport Mine, leased the Southport Mine property but kept the mine closed. This led to a decline of the town, although it was still shown on an 1896 USGS topographic map.

== See also ==
- Beaver Hill, Oregon
