= Cornwall, California =

Unincorporated community in California, United States

Cornwall
- Unincorporated community
- Location in California
- Coordinates: 38°01′14″N 121°52′44″W
- Country: United States
- State: California
- County: Contra Costa
- Elevation: 39 ft (12 m)
- GNIS ID: 253407

Cornwall, formerly known as Cornwall Station, was an unincorporated community in Contra Costa County, California, United States, before being absorbed into the City of Pittsburg. It was located 7.25 miles (11.67 km) east-southeast of Baypoint and 1 mile (1.6 km) south of downtown Pittsburg, at an elevation of 39 feet (12 m) ASL.

The area appears to have been named after Pierre Barlow Cornwall, an early California pioneer and president of the Black Diamond Coal Mining Company at nearby Nortonville from 1872 to 1904. Cornwall sprung up at the intersection of two railroads, the Black Diamond Coal Mining Railroad and the San Pablo and Tulare Railroad (the latter became part of the Southern Pacific system in 1888). The coal railroad crossed the San Pablo and Tulare line using an overhead trestle.

A post office operated at Cornwall Station from 1881 to 1888. Cornwall post office operated from 1890 to 1911.

The Cornwall area, together with the nearby town of Black Diamond, was officially renamed "Pittsburg" on February 11, 1911, which may explain why the Cornwall Post Office ceased operations in that same year.
