= Hesperolinon drymarioides =

Conservation status
- Imperiled (NatureServe)

Scientific classification
- Kingdom: Plantae
- Clade: Tracheophytes
- Clade: Angiosperms
- Clade: Eudicots
- Clade: Rosids
- Order: Malpighiales
- Family: Linaceae
- Genus: Hesperolinon
- Species: H. drymarioides

Binomial name
- Hesperolinon drymarioides (Curran) Small

Species of flowering plant

Hesperolinon drymarioides is a rare species of flowering plant in the flax family known by the common names drymary dwarf flax and drymaria-like western flax; it is named for its resemblance to genus Drymaria. It is endemic to California, where it grows in the central inland North Coast Range. Most of the few known occurrences have been noted in Lake County. It is a plant of serpentine soils in chaparral and woodland ecosystems. This is a small annual herb growing a thin branching brown stem low to the ground or erect to about 20 centimeters in height. Leaves appear in whorls of four on the lower part of the stem and are dark reddish green with plentiful glandular hairs. Its flowers have light pink-veined white petals in a corolla about a centimeter across. Protruding stamens hold large yellow or purplish-white anthers.
