= Warren Brown (sportswriter) =

American sportswriter

- Brown in 1964
- Born: January 3, 1894; Somersville, California, US
- Died: November 19, 1978 (aged 84); Forest Park, Illinois, US
- Occupation: Sportswriter
- Spouse: Olive Burns
- Children: 4
- Awards: J. G. Taylor Spink Award (1973)

Warren William Brown (January 3, 1894 – November 19, 1978) was an American sportswriter for over 50 years, spending the majority of his career in Chicago. He won the J. G. Taylor Spink Award in 1973.

== Early life ==
Brown was born in Somersville, California, a mining town near San Francisco. His father Patrick was the local saloon keeper. When the Somersville mines flooded, the family moved to San Francisco, where Brown was a firsthand witness to the great 1906 San Francisco earthquake. Brown attended St. Ignatius College (later renamed The University of San Francisco) for his prep school as well as university years. During his college years Brown played baseball for the Sacramento minor league team in the summers.

== Career ==
After getting his undergraduate degree he began his sportswriting career with the San Francisco Bulletin. After serving in U.S. Army intelligence stateside during World War I, Brown returned to the Bulletin, but soon moved to William Randolph Hearst's San Francisco Call & Post. Brown was one of the first sportswriters to hail a local boxer named Jack Dempsey. He also doubled as the paper's drama critic, specializing in vaudeville and musical comedy. In the early 1920s Brown was transferred to the Hearst paper in New York for a year. That is where he hired a young sportswriter named Ed Sullivan, who went on to be a society columnist and then a mid-century American icon with his TV variety show. Starting in 1920, Brown saw every World Series for fifty years. Brown's final move was to Chicago to be the sports editor of Hearsts Chicago Herald-Examiner. He was a sports editor, columnist and baseball beat writer (usually at the same time) for several Chicago papers over the next 40 years. While working at the Chicago American as sports editor he mentored a young sportswriter named Brent Musburger.

Brown was a friend and confidant of legendary University of Notre Dame football coach Knute Rockne. Brown and former Notre Dame running back Marchy Schwartz had dinner with Rockne in Chicago the night before his ill-fated plane crash. He wrote Rockne's biography in 1931.

Long credited to Grantland Rice, Brown was actually the person that coined the nickname for fabled Illinois running back Red Grange. He wrote a column describing Grange's running style and said he was like a "Galloping Ghost." The nickname is one of the most famous in sports annals. Brown also coined the nickname "The Sultan of Swat" for legendary baseball icon Babe Ruth.

As a beat writer and columnist he was known for his acerbic wit and breezy reporting style. Following the 1945 World Series, he wrote a history of the Chicago Cubs as part of the Putnam series of books that covered all the major league baseball teams. Mr. Brown's famous quote from the 1945 World Series between the Cubs and Tigers of "I don't think either one of them is good enough to win it" usually surfaces as the Cubs reach rare playoff appearances.

It was sufficiently well-received that The Chicago Cubs is one book in that series that has been periodically re-issued. In 1947 he wrote a memoir of sorts called Win, Lose or Draw. It was a collection of anecdotes about celebrated figures in sports Brown had crossed paths with in his first 30 years as a sportswriter.

From 1953 to 1965, Brown served on the Baseball Hall of Fame’s Veterans Committee. Posthumously, some have raised suspicions that he used his position to corruptly convince the rest of the Committee to induct Ray Schalk into the Hall of Fame. These allegations arise out of the fact that Schalk was a White Sox player; Brown was a Chicago-based sportswriter; and Brown may have been motivated to defend a statement he made in his 1952 book, The Chicago White Sox (another book Brown wrote for the Putnam series): He referred to Ray Schalk as one of the game’s great catchers. Although known for being a solid defensive catcher, Schalk was a woeful hitter who, as of September 2024, has the lowest batting average among all position players in the hall of fame.

In late 1973, Brown was named a recipient of the J. G. Taylor Spink Award from the Baseball Writers' Association of America. He was honored in ceremonies at the National Baseball Hall of Fame in Cooperstown, New York.

== Personal life ==
Brown's three sons were all athletes at the University of Notre Dame. Sons Bill and Pete were swimmers while youngest son, Roger, was a backup quarterback for the Fighting Irish on the 1946 and 1947 National Championship teams. Brown also had a daughter, Mary Elizabeth Rempe (née Brown).

Warren Brown died at age 84 in Forest Park, Illinois, and is buried in Queen of Heaven Cemetery in Hillside, Illinois, next to his beloved wife and best friend, Olive Burns Brown.

== Books ==
- Rockne (Chicago: Reilly & Lake, 1932)
- The Chicago Cubs (New York: Putnam, 1942)
- Win, Lose, or Draw (New York: Putnam, 1946)
- The Chicago White Sox (New York: Putnam, 1952)
