= Beaverhill =

Beaverhill and Beaver Hills may refer to:

- A beaver lodge
- Beaver Hill, Oregon, an unincorporated community in Coos County
- Beaverhill Lake, a lake in central Alberta
- Beaver Hills (Alberta), a rolling upland region
- Beaver Hills (Saskatchewan), a range of hills
- Beaver Hills (New Haven), a neighborhood in the city of New Haven, Connecticut
- Beaverhill Lake Group, a geological region of Canada
