= Black Diamond Coal Mining Railroad =

The Black Diamond Coal Mining Railroad was 5.9 miles (9.5 km) long and ran from Black Diamond Landing, California (now part of the city of Pittsburg, California) to Nortonville, California. It was owned and operated by the Black Diamond Coal Mining Company and therefore did not have its own official name. Over the years, it has been known by at least four different names. (A report prepared by the State in the 1880s referred to it as both the "Black Diamond Coal Mining Railroad Company" and the "Black Diamond Railroad." It has also been referred to as the "Black Diamond Coal Company Railroad" and the "Black Diamond Coal and Railroad Company.")

The railroad was built by Gold Rush-era civil engineer and artist Sherman Day, and opened for service in 1868 primarily to serve the Black Diamond Coal Mine at Nortonville. At the town of Cornwall, California the railroad crossed the tracks of the Southern Pacific Railroad using an overhead trestle.

It was mostly standard gauge, however there was a small segment that was narrow gauge from the mine portals to coal bunkers.

The railroad had four locomotives, two built in San Francisco by H. J. Booth at the Union Iron Works, one built in San Francisco by Vulcan Iron Works and one from the Baldwin Locomotive Works in Philadelphia, Pennsylvania. Three locomotives had names: The D. O. Mills (named after Darius Ogden Mills), the Hayward (named after Alvinza Hayward), and the Black Diamond. One locomotive was a narrow-gauge engine that was used to bring mine cars from the mine portals to the bunkers.

Trains ran by gravity from Nortonville to Black Diamond Landing because it was all downhill.

The railroad was abandoned in about 1885 when the Black Diamond Coal Mining Company closed its mine at Nortonville and moved all of its employees to another of the Company's mines at Black Diamond, Washington Territory.

In 1888, two of its locomotives, the D. O. Mills and the Black Diamond were transferred to the Bellingham Bay and British Columbia Railroad ("BB&BC") in the state of Washington. The BB&BC was a company that had strong ties to the Black Diamond Coal Mining Company because the two companies had the same management. The locomotive named Hayward was sold for scrap.

Today, part of the old roadbed can still be seen along Nortonville Road between Pittsburg, California and Nortonville. What it looks like on google maps present day The terminus at Nortonville is now a historic preserve managed by the East Bay Regional Park District.

== See also ==
- Black Diamond Mines Regional Preserve
