= Hesperolinon serpentinum =

Scientific classification
- Kingdom: Plantae
- Clade: Tracheophytes
- Clade: Angiosperms
- Clade: Eudicots
- Clade: Rosids
- Order: Malpighiales
- Family: Linaceae
- Genus: Hesperolinon
- Species: H. serpentinum

Binomial name
- Hesperolinon serpentinum N.McCarten

Species of flowering plant

Hesperolinon serpentinum is a rare species of flowering plant in the flax family known by the common name Napa dwarf flax, or Napa western flax. Hesperolinon serpentinum was not validly published by McCarten although it appears in the Jepson Manual (Hickman, 1993). The species was validly published as Hesperolinon sharsmithae in 2006 by O'Donnell (Madroño 53:404–408). The species is endemic to northern California, where it is known from fewer than twenty occurrences in four counties surrounding the San Francisco Bay Area. It is a member of chaparral plant communities, generally on serpentine soils. It produces a thin, erect stem up to 30 centimeters tall, with sparse flat, narrow leaves. The inflorescence holds several light yellow flowers with petals only 2 or 3 millimeters long. The plant is threatened mainly by development of its habitat.
