= Hesperolinon tehamense =

Conservation status
- Critically Imperiled (NatureServe)

Scientific classification
- Kingdom: Plantae
- Clade: Tracheophytes
- Clade: Angiosperms
- Clade: Eudicots
- Clade: Rosids
- Order: Malpighiales
- Family: Linaceae
- Genus: Hesperolinon
- Species: H. tehamense

Binomial name
- Hesperolinon tehamense H. K. Sharsmith

Species of flowering plant

Hesperolinon tehamense is a rare species of flowering plant in the flax family known by the common names Tehama County western flax and Paskenta Grade dwarf flax. It is endemic to northern California, where it is known from only about ten occurrences, mostly within Tehama and Glenn Counties. Most of its habitat is on Bureau of Land Management lands and within the Mendocino National Forest, in chaparral ecosystems with serpentine soils. The plant produces thin, hairy stems up to 50 centimeters in maximum height with small, sparse linear leaves. The inflorescence bears several small flowers with pale to bright yellow notched petals just a few millimeters long.
