= Noah Norton =

American museum founder (1786–1877)

Noah Norton (April 7, 1786 – January 31, 1877) was a government agent, museum founder, and California Gold Rush prospector. He was instrumental in founding the towns of Adrian, Michigan and Nortonville, California.

== Early life ==
Norton was born in Greene County, New York, on April 7, 1786. As a young man, he moved near Lake Ontario and became a government officer having the duty to stop the smuggling of contraband traffic across the US-Canada border.

When the War of 1812 commenced, he volunteered and served as a Lieutenant and participated in the Battle of Lundy's Lane.

== Life in Michigan ==
After the war, Norton relocated his family to a wilderness area that would eventually become Adrian, Michigan. In 1827, the Norton residence was the site of the first church service in Adrian.

Norton volunteered during the Mexican–American War (1846–1848) and became a member of the secret service. After the Mexican–American War, he spent a short time back in Adrian, then embarked on a mission to gather specimens and other objects of interest for a museum in Pensacola, Florida. He later founded a museum of his own at Adrian.

== Life in California ==
During the California Gold Rush (1848–1855), he disposed of the museum and joined a wagon train for California. He took the so-called "southern route," and was one of the first settlers of Los Angeles, California in 1850.

After a few years working in Los Angeles as a farmer, Norton returned to Adrian where his wife soon died. He later remarried and moved back to California, this time settling in Contra Costa County, California, where he prospected for coal. In 1861, he founded the town of Nortonville, California, where a large coal mine named the "Black Diamond" was located. Nortonville is now part of the Black Diamond Mines Regional Preserve, managed by the East Bay Regional Park District.

His wife, Sarah Norton, became a locally famous midwife who met a violent death in October, 1879, by a runaway horse pulling her carriage. Her son would later be the person to place his Mother at Rose Hill Cemetery in what is now Black Diamond Regional Park. She is buried in Rose Hill Cemetery, at Nortonville, where it is rumored that she periodically presents herself to visitors as a white ghost.

== Death and burial ==
Noah Norton died on January 31, 1877, and is buried in the Webster Family Plot (Plot #1) at the Mountain View Cemetery in Oakland, California. (The Websters were his grandchildren.)
