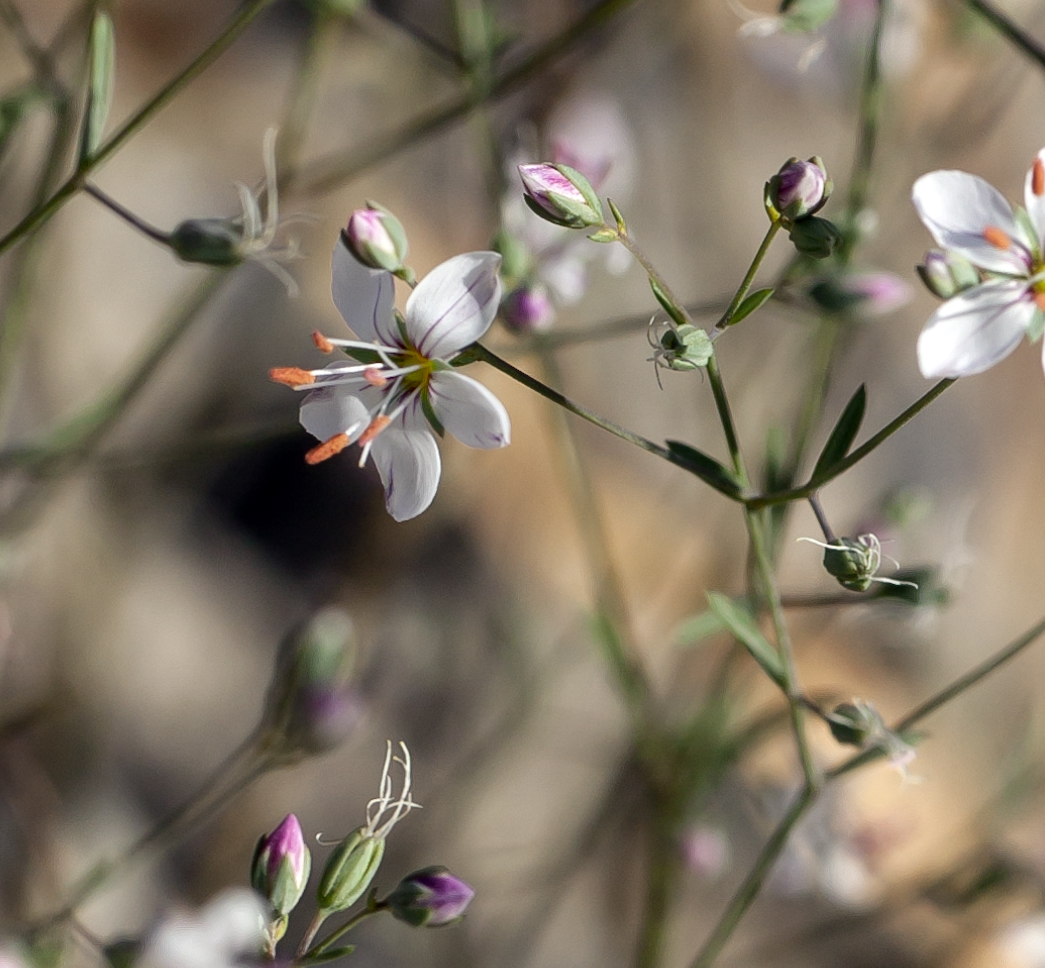

Scientific classification
- Kingdom: Plantae
- Clade: Tracheophytes
- Clade: Angiosperms
- Clade: Eudicots
- Clade: Rosids
- Order: Malpighiales
- Family: Linaceae
- Genus: Hesperolinon
- Species: H. disjunctum

Binomial name
- Hesperolinon disjunctum H.Sharsm.

= Hesperolinon disjunctum =

Species of flowering plant

Hesperolinon disjunctum is a species of flowering plant in the flax family known by the common name Coast Range dwarf flax. It is endemic to California, where it has a disjunct distribution along the North and Central Coast Ranges.

It is a plant of serpentine soils in chaparral habitat.

== Description ==
This is an annual herb producing an erect stem up to 30 centimeters tall, somewhat thick and tough at the base. The glandular leaves are linear in shape and are alternately arranged along the stem. The inflorescence is a wide open cyme of flowers, each flower with glandular sepals and pink-veined white petals about half a centimeter long. The protruding stamens are tipped with pink anthers. It flowers from April to July.
