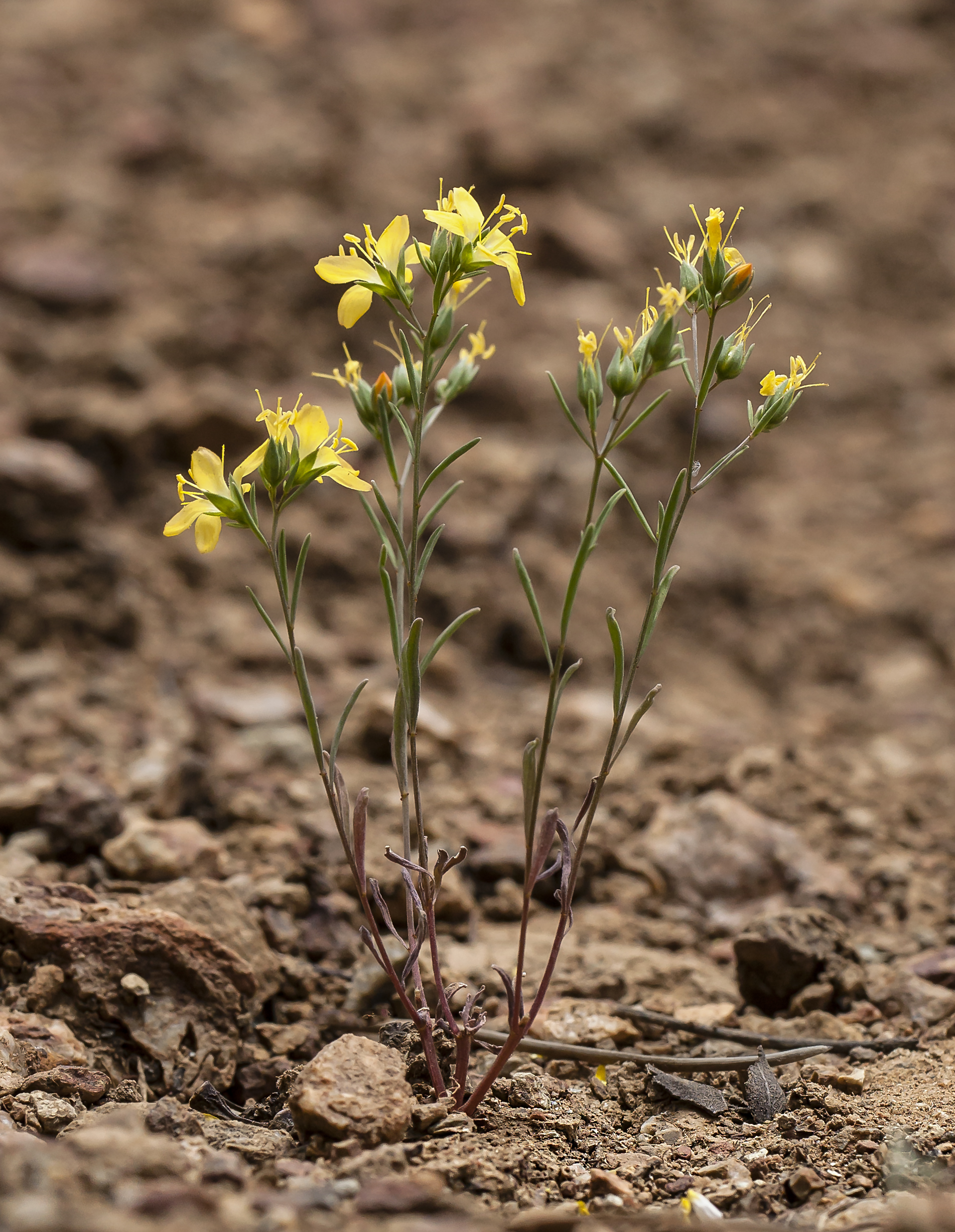

Conservation status
- Imperiled (NatureServe)

Scientific classification
- Kingdom: Plantae
- Clade: Tracheophytes
- Clade: Angiosperms
- Clade: Eudicots
- Clade: Rosids
- Order: Malpighiales
- Family: Linaceae
- Genus: Hesperolinon
- Species: H. breweri

Binomial name
- Hesperolinon breweri (A. Gray) Small

= Hesperolinon breweri =

Species of flowering plant

Hesperolinon breweri is a rare species of flowering plant in the flax family known by the common names Brewer's dwarf flax and Brewer's western flax. It is endemic to California, where it is known from three counties in the San Francisco Bay Area. It is found in chaparral ecosystems, often on serpentine soils. This is an annual herb growing erect to a maximum height near centimeters. Its narrow, linear leaves are greenish to purplish in color. It produces dense inflorescences of flowers with glandular sepals and five bright yellow petals. The protruding stamens hold large orange-yellow anthers. This uncommon California endemic is threatened by development of its habitat but its current status is not known.
