= Black Diamond Mines Regional Preserve =

Historic place in Contra Costa County, California, USA

- Black Diamond Mines
- U.S. National Register of Historic Places
- U.S. Historic district
- California Historical Landmark
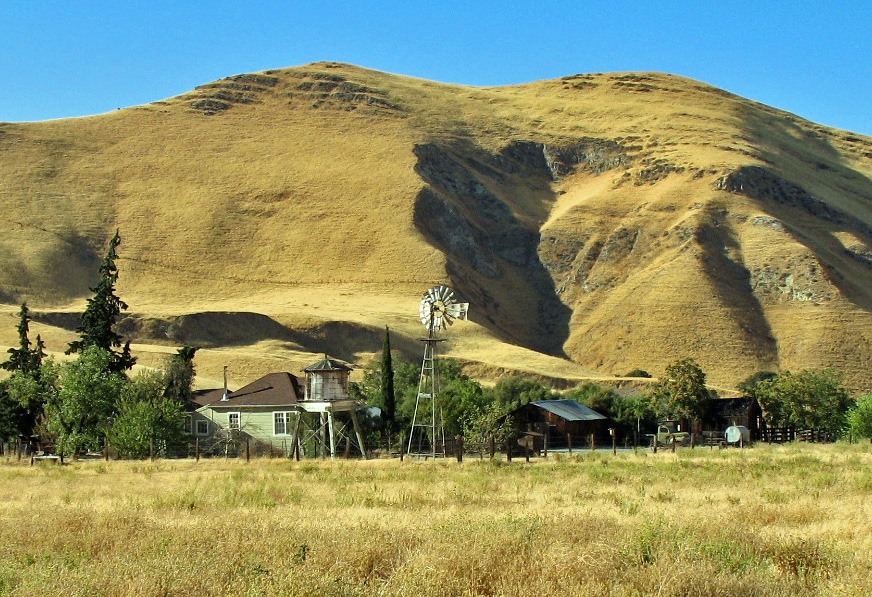

- Location within California Location within the United States
- Nearest city: Antioch, California
- Coordinates: 37°57′1″N 121°51′25″W
- NRHP reference No.: 91001425
- CHISL No.: 932
- Added to NRHP: October 02, 1991

Rose Hill Cemetery, Black Diamond Mines

Rose Hill Cemetery, Black Diamond Mines

Trail to a mine, Black Diamond Mines

The Black Diamond Mines Regional Preserve is a 6,000-acre (2,400 ha) park located north of Mount Diablo in Contra Costa County, California under the administration of the East Bay Regional Park District (EBRPD). The district acquired the property in 1973. The preserve contains relics of 3 mining towns, former coal and sand mines, and offers guided tours of a former sand mine. The 60 miles (97 km) of trails in the Preserve cross rolling foothill terrain covered with grassland, California oak woodland, California mixed evergreen forest, and chaparral.

== History ==
=== Indigenous history ===
Long before the widespread ranching and mining activity that took place in the area, indigenous people had a presence in the Bay Area for 13,000 years. Three Bay Miwok tribes, the Chupcan, Ompin, and Volvon, lived in the areas surrounding the Black Diamond Mines Regional Preserve. The Chupcan occupied territory to the west of the preserve near Concord, the Volvon occupied the territory to the south including much of Mount Diablo, and the Ompin occupied the area to the north including Pittsburg, Collinsville, and the intervening waterway. Black Diamond Mines Regional Preserve is located in a boundary area between these three tribes. At the beginning of the 19th century, these three tribes were significantly impacted by the Spanish mission system. Between 1804 and 1806, Spanish missionaries and soldiers enslaved most of the Volvon Bay Miwok, dispersing them between Mission Dolores and Mission San Jose, where they were compelled to labor and forbidden to leave. A Spanish military raid caused the Chupcans to flee to Suisun territory in 1804, and by 1811, most Chupcans were enslaved at either Mission Dolores or Mission San Jose. In 1810, some members of the Ompin were sent to Mission Dolores, and the remaining members were sent to Mission San Jose in the years 1811 and 1812.

=== Mount Diablo Coalfield ===
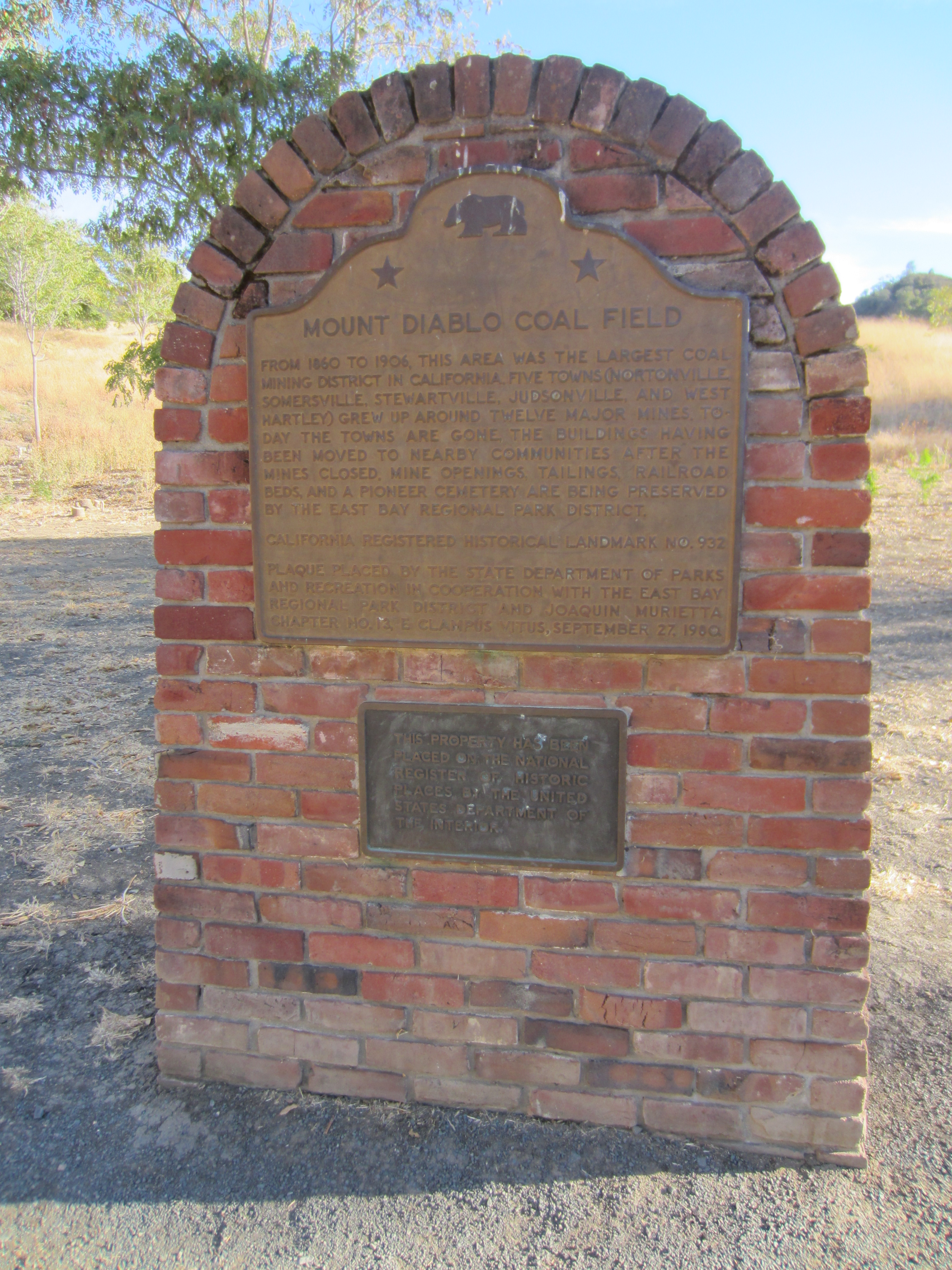
Historic marker for Mt. Diablo coal field

In 1859 William C. Israel discovered a coal deposit while clearing out a spring on his land at Horse Haven Valley, six miles south of Antioch. His initial attempt to mine the coal was not financially successful but soon other coal deposits were discovered nearby and mining operations grew rapidly. The area became known as the Mount Diablo Coalfield, producing more than 4 million tons of coal during this time.

The area includes the remains of twelve coal mines and the sites of several long-gone coal mining towns. The Preserve contains over 200 miles (320 km) of mine workings. The largest and oldest town, Nortonville, had a peak population of about 1,000. Somersville, Stewartville, West Hartley and Judsonville were located in valleys to the east. The sites of Judsonville and West Hartley are located on private property outside the eastern boundary of the Preserve. The mines were the Empire, Central, Star, Corcoran, Pittsburg, Manhattan, Eureka, Independent, Union, Black Diamond, Mt. Hope, and Cumberland. The coal produced was of a low grade (sub-bituminous or lignite), but for a time in the 19th century, was the only readily accessible and economic source in California. Therefore, it was a very valuable resource and powering the railroads, ships and heavy industry of California. The mineral was often called 'black diamond."

The coal was carried to the San Joaquin River by three railroads: the Empire, Pittsburg, and Black Diamond, for shipment by barge to markets in San Francisco, Sacramento, Stockton and other communities. Coal mining activity ended as better-quality imported coal became affordable and as petroleum emerged as an energy source. After the coal mines closed, the towns were abandoned and the area was used mainly for cattle grazing.

In 1973 the Southport Land and Commercial Company (former Black Diamond Coal Mining Company) donated 160 acres of its land holdings to the East Bay Regional Park District. Early plans for the park considered the name Nortonville-Somersville Coal Mines Regional Park. The park eventually opened on May 8, 1976 as the Black Diamond Mines Regional Park. An additional 176.18 acres of land which includes the former Nortonville town site was acquired by the East Bay Regional Park District in December 1980.

In the period between the mines ceasing operations and the East Bay Regional Park District acquiring the land, many area youths visited the former Nortonville and Somersville town sites for recreation and to explore the abandoned mines. Some were gravely injured or killed due to falls, cave-ins, or asphyxiation from dangerous gases. Immediately after assuming ownership, the East Bay Regional Park District began a mine hazard abatement program to close the coal mines, with assistance provided by the United States Department of the Interior, Office of Surface Mining. Since that time no deaths have occurred within the park. In 1980 four young boys were killed on private land adjacent to the park when they were exposed to methane gas a mile within an unsealed coal mine.

Park staff have maintained a public-access opening into a former coal mine known as Prospect Tunnel. Visitors can explore the first 200 feet (61 m) of this approximately 400-foot tunnel.

=== Rose Hill Cemetery ===
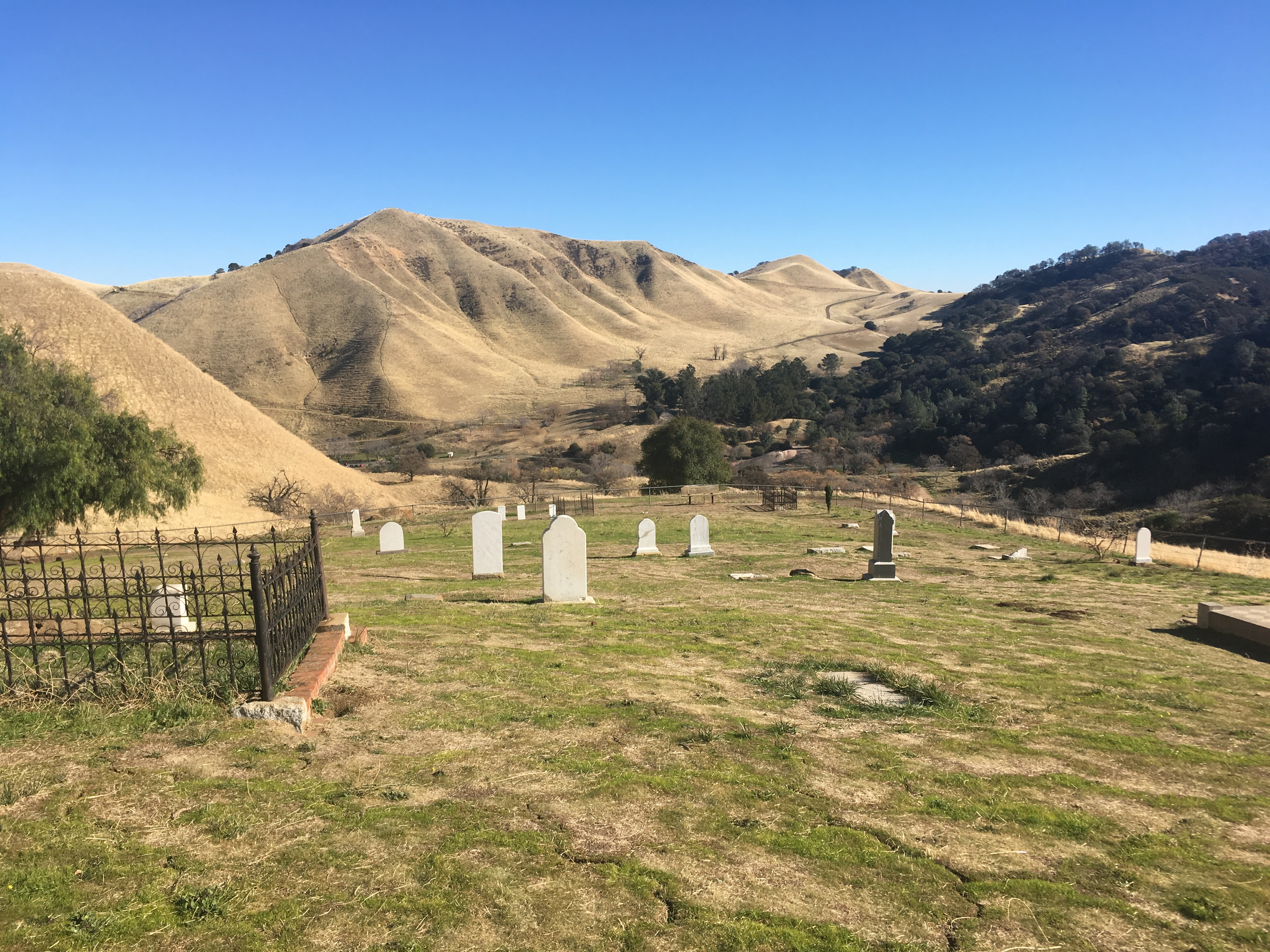
Rose Hill Cemetery

Rose Hill Cemetery, officially designated as a Protestant cemetery, the final resting place for over 200 residents of the coalfield, is located on a hillside between the Somersville and Nortonville townsites. (Note: One writer states that there were over 230 burial plots, though the exact number cannot be documented. Only 80 gravestones remained in 2016. Men buried there were mostly immigrant miners from Wales, killed in mining accidents, while the women were wives who died during childbirth. The majority of graves in the cemetery are for children who died in epidemics of scarlet fever, typhoid fever, smallpox, and diphtheria during the late 1800s.) After the mines closed and the nearby towns were abandoned, the cemetery fell into disuse. Many of the gravestones were stolen or destroyed by vandals, or damaged by cattle using them as scratching posts. In 1960, Ansel Adams photographed two Italian Cypress trees in the cemetery, and called the image, "Poplars, Cemetery near Mount Diablo".

Those buried in the cemetery include coal miners who were killed as a result of their work in the mines. However, the majority of the buried are children from the nearby towns of Nortonville and Somersville who died of diseases such as smallpox, scarlet fever, diphtheria, and typhoid.

Few people buried in the cemetery are identified. Many of the individual plots were never marked. More had only a wooden marker – nearly all of which were destroyed over the years by either wildfires that swept through the area or by insects, weather, or other natural cause. Vandals are said to have carried off some of the more permanent stone markers. The original records for the cemetery were destroyed in the 1906 San Francisco earthquake and fire.

The land the cemetery occupies was originally owned by the Black Diamond Coal Mining Company president and chief stockholder Alvinza Hayward, who left it to his daughter Emma Rose upon his death. In the 1940s she deeded the land to Contra Costa County. It was transferred to the East Bay Regional Park District in September 1973. Since that time park staff has undertaken restoration of the cemetery, including stabilizing eroded soil, repairing and reinstalling gravestones, and marking burial sites missing gravestones with brass plaques. They have also sought to recover stolen gravestones, such as an 1883 gravestone for 8-year-old Walter E. Clare that was returned in 2002 by a local family who discovered it buried on their property while replacing a sewer line.

A few whose earthly remains were laid to rest here include:

- William Gething, age 36, who was killed with 10 other men in an 1876 mine explosion; 7 other men who died in the same accident are buried nearby. The citizens of Nortonville raised $300 to erect a white bronze monument to these men, located in the cemetery. The monument was stolen or destroyed sometime after the 1930s.
- Sarah Norton, age 68, wife of Noah Norton (namesake of Nortonville), who worked as a midwife and was killed instantly when she was thrown from her buggy on her way to attend a delivery; she reportedly delivered over 600 babies for miners' wives.
- The earliest stone marker belongs to Elizabeth Richmond, who died in February, 1865.
- The youngest known person was the one-day-old, unnamed daughter of Thomas H. and Elizabeth Jenkins, who died on April 15, 1880.
- The oldest known person was Ruth French, age 81, died on September 11, 1874.
- The most recent known burial was William T. Davis, died in 1954.

=== Sandstone mines ===
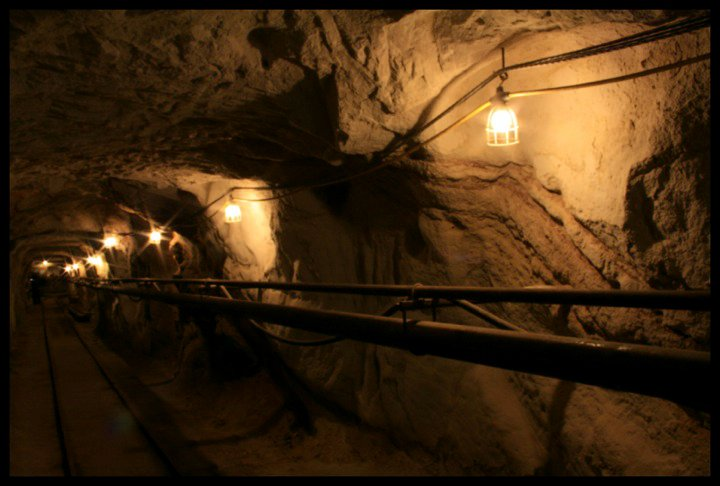
Inside the Hazel-Atlas Mine at Black Diamond Mines Regional Preserve

In the 1920s, a mine producing high-quality silica sandstone was started by owner Marvin Greathouse on a hillside above the Somersville townsite. He sold the product to the Hazel-Atlas Glass Company which operated a plant in Oakland manufacturing glass containers. Hazel-Atlas eventually purchased the mine and operated it until about 1945. Another sandstone mine in the Nortonville area produced sand used by the Columbia Steel mill in Pittsburg, California, for steel casting. The two companies recovered more than 1.8×10^{6} short tons (1.6×10^{6} long tons) of sand between from the 1920s to the 1940s. The Hazel-Atlas mine is being restored and maintained by park staff and can be visited on guided tours which cover the area's mining history and geology.

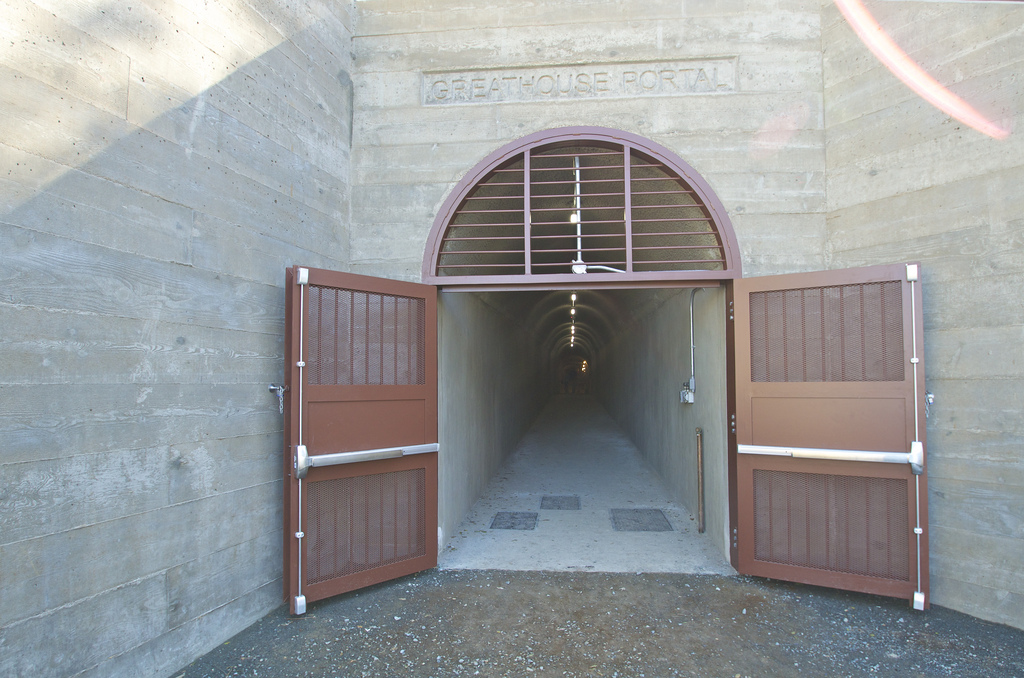
Greathouse Portal, Black Diamond Mine Regional Preserve in 2012

Inside the Greathouse portal, a 950 foot (290 m)-long section of the entrance corridor has been made into a museum. The first section is a series of self-guided exhibits, while the larger second section (which has a separate entrance from the outside), houses a reconstruction of the Hazel-Atlas works as it would have appeared around 1940.

Park staff originally repurposed the Hazel-Atlas mine as a museum in the 1970s, but storm damage in 2007 forced closure of this attraction for extensive repairs. It did not reopen for five years.

== Geology ==
The rich coal deposits and sandstone hills of Black Diamond Mines Regional Preserve were formed by geological activity in the Tertiary period. In the period between the Paleocene epoch and Miocene epoch of the Tertiary era, the North American Plate and the Pacific plate came together at a subduction zone where the North American Plate was pushed over the Pacific Plate. During this era, the Pacific Ocean stretched over much of the California central valley with the coastline reaching the lower regions of the Sierra Nevada mountains. Tectonic activity between the North American and Pacific plate, along with sea level changes, brought about four series of marine sediment deposition. The coal that was mined from the Mount Diablo Coal Field was formed during the third marine sediment deposition cycle which took place during the middle of the Eocene epoch. At the beginning of this third cycle, tectonic activity caused an uplift of the continental shelf seafloor, resulting in the creation of shallow marshes. Erosion during this era brought an abundance of sediment into the shallow sea covering the continental shelf, with some sediment making its way into the marshlands. These sediments, along with the favorable hot and humid climate, fueled the growth of coastal marsh flora that eventually formed into coal. Tectonic activity towards the end of this sedimentation cycle caused the continental shelf to sink and resulted in sediments being deposited into deeper water. The Mount Diablo Mountain Range of today was created at the beginning of the fourth depositional cycle when the continental shelf began to rise up once again.

== Recreation ==
The trails offer views of Mount Diablo, the Sacramento-San Joaquin River Delta, and on clear days, the Sierra Nevada.

The Preserve usually has an impressive variety of wildflowers in spring including the rare Mount Diablo fairy lantern (Calochortus pulchellus), Mount Diablo sunflower (Helianthella castanea), and Brewer's dwarf flax (Hesperolinon breweri). It is home to a variety of wildlife including deer, mountain lions, coyotes, foxes, bobcats, golden eagles, and a variety of hawks. The endangered San Joaquin kit fox (Vulpes macrotis mutica) and threatened California red-legged frog (Rana draytonii), California tiger salamander (Ambystoma californiense) and Alameda whipsnake (Masticophis lateralis) are present as well. The park is open year-round for hiking, mountain biking, and horseback riding from 8 am to dusk. A backpack camp and a group camp can be reserved for overnight stays. There have been many reports of a ghost in the park.

== 2016 land donation ==
East Bay Regional Park District accepted the donation of 50 acres (20 ha) by Antioch Holdings LLC on December 20, 2016. The property had been deeded to the holding company by Gordon Grevelle, president of Suncrest Homes, who had originally planned to build a gated residential community there when he had bought the tract in 1987. After going through an extensive permitting process and a decline in the California housing market, Grevelle decided that the project he had envisioned would be unlikely to meet his financial goals. Since the tract was already surrounded by park land, he chose to make the land available to East Bay Regional Park District, which announced its intention to add the land to the Black Diamond Mines Regional Preserve. Grevelle estimated the market value of his donation at $3.5 million in 2016 (~$4.6 million in 2025).

== See also ==
- National Register of Historic Places listings in Contra Costa County, California
- List of California Historical Landmarks
- sandstone
