= Goshen, Washington =

Ghost town in Washington (state)

- Ghost town
- Location within Washington (state) Location within the United States
- Coordinates: 48°51′16″N 122°20′28″W
- Country: United States
- State: Washington
- County: Whatcom
- Elevation: 180 ft (55 m)
- Time zone: UTC-8 (Pacific (PST))
  - Summer (DST): UTC-7 (PDT)
- GNIS feature ID: 1511001

Goshen was a pioneer town in western Whatcom County (approximately 5 miles (8 km) northeast of Bellingham, and 10 miles (16 km) south of the US border with Canada).

Goshen was a logging and farming community. The town was a stop on the rail line of the Bellingham Bay and British Columbia Railroad. At one point Goshen hoped to compete with Whatcom (now Bellingham) and Seattle for the western depot of the railroad line which was being laid north to Washington State, which would guarantee economic investment and much traffic. Tacoma won the contest.

The name remains in Goshen Road and, a short distance to the west, Everson-Goshen Road.

== See also ==
- List of ghost towns in Washington
