= Chehalis (1867 steamboat) =

History
- Name: Chehalis
- Completed: 1867, Tumwater, Washington
- Out of service: 1882
- Identification: US registry no. 5694
- Fate: Blown ashore in gale, total loss.

General characteristics
- Type: inland steamboat
- Tonnage: 87.97 regist.
- Length: 90 ft (27.43 m)
- Installed power: twin single-cylinder steam engines; cylinder bores 10 in (25.4 cm); stroke 36 in (91.4 cm)
- Propulsion: sternwheel
- Notes: Engines from 1859 sternwheeler Henrietta.

Chehalis was a sternwheel steamboat that ran on the Chehalis River, Puget Sound, and Lake Washington from 1867 to 1882. This vessel should not be confused with other steam vessels named Chehalis.

== Career ==
Chehalis was built at Tumwater, Washington, in 1867 by H.H. Hyde. The engines for Chehalis came from the Fraser River sternwheeler Henrietta, which had been built at Victoria in 1859. For nearly three years following construction, the owners of Chehalis tried to compete on Grays Harbor and the Chehalis River. This proved unsuccessful, and so the vessel was returned to Puget Sound where it proved more profitable. Chehalis was first put on the route between Snohomish, Port Gamble, and Port Ludlow.

Chehalis was later sold to the Black Diamond Coal Mining Company of California, which was operating mines in the Black Diamond area south of Lake Washington. Under Captain Huffner and Capt. William Bailey (1822–1882), Chehalis was used to tow barges on the lake. (Captain Bailey was later killed in a dock accident at Yesler Wharf.)

Capt J.C. Brittain and Capt. Thomas Brennan then bought Chehalis and ran the vessel on the Skagit River. Chehalis was the first vessel to go up the Skagit as far as Portage Rapids, and the first to ascend the Sauk River. The vessel was in charge of captains Daniel Benson, Curtis D. Brownfield, and Robert Bailey while on the Skagit River. Chehalis was also run on the Seattle-Olympia route under Capt. Hiram Olney.

== Wrecked ==
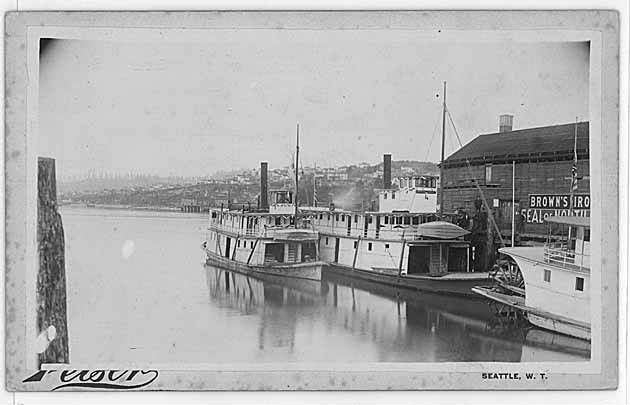
The steamers W.F. Munroe and Nellie docked in Seattle

In November 1882, under the command of Capt. W.F. Munroe, Chehalis was caught in a gale en route from Snohomish to Seattle. The vessel became unmanageable, and was blown ashore stern first near Ten Mile Point. Chehalis was a total loss, and her cargo was strewn along ten miles of the shore.
