= Lost Son (novel) =

- Author: M. Allen Cunningham
- Language: English
- Publisher: Unbridled Books
- Publication date: 2007
- Dewey Decimal: 813.6
- LC Class: PS3603.U667 L67

Lost Son is a novel by M. Allen Cunningham, published in May 2007 by Unbridled Books. It is about Rainer Maria Rilke (1875–1926), the famous poet of the Duino Elegies and author of Letters to a Young Poet.

Lost Son spans Western Europe from 1875 to 1917, depicting Rilke's life from birth to age 42. The poet is shown as child, lover, husband, father, protégé, misfit soldier, and lifelong wanderer. The novel explores Rilke's relationships with his parents, his wife Clara Westhoff and their daughter Ruth, the painter Paula Modersohn-Becker, the French sculptor Auguste Rodin, and Lou Andreas-Salomé.

Reviews of Lost Son were mixed. Publishers Weekly praised Cunningham's talent, but concluded that "unwelcome shifts into second-person and passages rife with adjective abuse mar this ambitious undertaking". Writing for January Magazine, Cherie Thiessen called the book "hugely ambitious" but noted that "meticulously reflecting the thoughts, the anguish, the reflections and insights of a gifted and introspective poet can become tedious". Vernon Peterson of The Oregonian compared the book favorably to Cunningham's debut novel The Green Age of Asher Witherow, writing that Cunningham "has achieved a mature style and authentic voice in Lost Son".
