= Black Diamond, Arizona =

Populated place in Cochise County

- Populated place
- Location within the state of Arizona Black Diamond, Arizona (the United States)
- Coordinates: 31°50′37″N 109°54′24″W
- Country: United States
- State: Arizona
- County: Cochise
- Elevation: 5,138 ft (1,566 m)
- Time zone: UTC-7 (Mountain (MST))
  - Summer (DST): UTC-7 (MST)
- Area code: 520
- FIPS code: 04-06645
- GNIS feature ID: 24324

Black Diamond is a populated place situated in Cochise County, Arizona, United States.
