= Whatcom Parks and Recreation Foundation =

- Abbreviation: WPRF
- Founded at: Whatcom County, Washington
- Type: 501(c)(3) non-profit organization 2
- Legal status: Operating
- Purpose: Encourage public and private support for parks and recreation projects within Whatcom County 3
- Headquarters: Whatcom County, Washington
- Location: United States 48.7649°N 122.4900°E
- Region served: Whatcom County, Washington
- Methods: Grants, advocacy, project development
- Fields: Parks and recreation
- Official language: English
- Owner: Public
- Ex Officio Members: Representatives from all city parks departments and park districts in Whatcom County [1]
- Funding: Private donations, grants

The Whatcom Parks and Recreation Foundation (WPRF) is a 501(c)3 non-profit organization operating in Whatcom County, Washington. The mission of the Whatcom Parks and Recreation Foundation is to encourage public and private support for parks and recreation projects within Whatcom County. It serves as a trust for privately donated park funding, as a fiscal sponsor for smaller groups of park advocates, and promotes its own initiatives within the community. Ex Officio members on the Board of Directors represent all of the city parks departments and park districts in Whatcom County, including Bellingham, Lynden, Blaine, Northwest Park District and Whatcom County Parks and Recreation.

On October 11, 2012, the Whatcom Parks and Recreation Foundation held a summit in Bellingham, Washington, to explore the issue of active transportation in the region. The keynote address was given by Washington State Director of Public Transportation, Brian Lagerberg.

In 2012 the Whatcom Parks and Recreation Foundation received a grant from the Whatcom Community Foundation to work on their Nooksack Loop Trail project, a proposed 45-mile (72 km) multi-modal trail in north Whatcom County.

The Whatcom Parks and Recreation Foundation awards one or more Whatcom County citizens each year with the William Dittrich Award for service to parks and recreational opportunities. In 2012 the award was given to Adrienne Lederer and Julianna Guy, who together formed the Cordata Neighborhood Association.
