= Beaver Hill, Oregon =

Unincorporated community in the state of Oregon, United States

- Unincorporated community
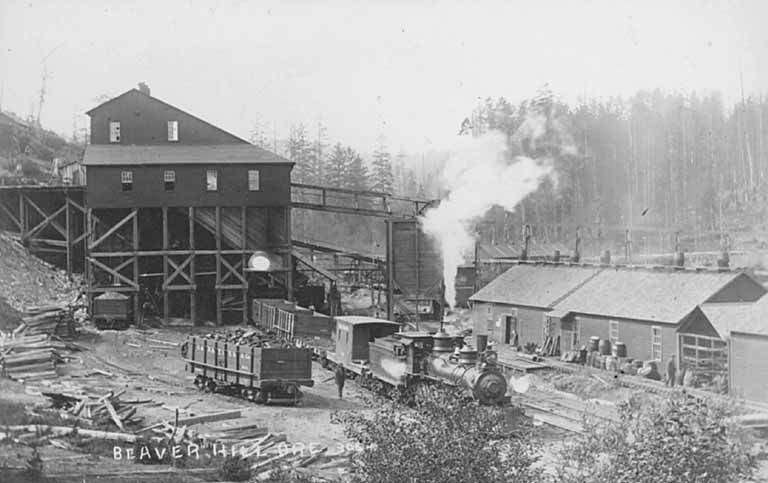
- Locomotive hauling ore cars, Beaver Hill Coal Mine mill, circa 1912

- Location within the state of Oregon Beaver Hill (the United States)
- Coordinates: 43°13′47″N 124°16′06″W
- Country: United States
- State: Oregon
- County: Coos
- Elevation: 138 ft (42 m)
- Time zone: UTC-8 (Pacific (PST))
  - Summer (DST): UTC-7 (PDT)
- GNIS feature ID: 1117447

Beaver Hill is a ghost town in Coos County, Oregon, United States. It is about 12 miles (19 km) south of the city of Coos Bay, east of U.S. Route 101 and west of Oregon Route 42.

Beaver Hill was formerly a coal mining community. The Beaver Hill mine was opened in 1894 by the J. D. Spreckels Company and the town was later owned by Southern Pacific. By 1896, Beaver Hill was an important community in the area and on January 11, it incorporated as a city. In 1926, 15 of the city's 16 remaining voters chose to disincorporate. Today there is nothing left at the site.

The community had a branch off the Coos Bay Line of the Southern Pacific Railroad, but it never had a post office by the name Beaver Hill. The post office at this locale was named Preuss; it ran from 1917 to 1924. It was named for a local teacher, Rosa Preuss. It is possible the name "Beaver Hill" for a post office would not have been approved because of the similarity to Beaverton and Beavercreek.

== See also ==
- Southport, Oregon
