= The Black Diamonds =

Australian rock band

- Also known as: Johnny Kett's Black Diamonds; Tymepiece; Love Machine
- Origin: Lithgow, New South Wales, Australia
- Genres: Garage rock; surf rock; psychedelic
- Years active: 1959–1971
- Labels: Festival; Infinity
- Past members: Johnny Kett; Alan "Olly" Oloman; Brandt Newton; Allen Keogh; Neil Oloman; Glenn Bland; Colin McAuley; Brian "Felix" Wilkinson; Darcy Rosser

The Black Diamonds were an Australian garage rock band from Lithgow, New South Wales, which were active under different names from 1959 to 1971. By 1965 the line-up consisted of Glenn Bland on vocals and harmonica, Allen Keogh on bass guitar, Colin McAuley on drums, Alan "Olly" Oloman on lead guitar and vocals, and his younger brother Neil Oloman on rhythm guitar. They signed with Festival Records, where they released two singles. The better-known B-side track, "I Want, Need, Love You", appeared on their first single in 1966 and became a regional hit. It features an pleading vocal over a driving rhythm section and fast guitar breaks. The band toured in support of the Easybeats. In 1967 their second single, "Outside Looking In", was a hit in the Sydney area. In 1968 the group changed their name to Tymepiece and evolved into a more eclectic and progressive style. Briefly changing their name to Love Machine they released a cover version of the Tokens' single, "Lion Sleeps Tonight" (1968). They reverted to Tymepiece and issued an album, Sweet Release, in February 1971 but broke up soon after. According to Australian musicologist, Ian McFarlane, "[they] will be remembered as one of the most ferocious garage/punk outfits Australia ever produced in the 1960s."

== Origins: Johnny Kett's Black Diamonds 1959–1965 ==
The Black Diamonds were founded in Lithgow, New South Wales, a coal-mining town in New South Wales, as Johnny Kett's Black Diamonds in 1959. Allen Michael Keogh and Alan Stewart Oloman, both twelve years old, learned guitar from an older friend, Brandt Newton. The three started playing regularly, mostly rockabilly instrumentals. Johnny Kett joined on drums, but initially they had no bass guitarist. Oloman's father, Bill Oloman (c.1911–2006), became their manager and allowed them to rehearse at the family home. He also provided their name, Johnny Kett's Black Diamonds, after their then-leader and a local term for coal.

The group gained a residency at Scottish Reunion Dance, a local dance hall. In 1963 Newton departed and Oloman's younger brother, Neil Oloman joined on rhythm guitar, while Keogh switched to bass guitar. They largely performed surf instrumentals. With the advent of the Beatles and the British Invasion in 1964, they found a lead vocalist, Glenn Christopher Bland. Bland initially also provided rhythm guitar, allowing Alan to concentrate on lead guitar. The group's leadership shifted from Kett to Alan, whose increasingly virtuoso lead guitar was emerging as a key feature in their sound. Bland dropped rhythm guitar but continued on lead vocals and added harmonica.

== Recording and touring 1965–1968 ==
In 1965 Kett departed and their name was shortened to the Black Diamonds with the line-up of Bland on vocals and harmonica, Keogh on bass guitar, Alan on lead guitar and vocals, and Neil on rhythm guitar – they were joined by Colin McAuley on drums. They became a popular band in the Blue Mountains area. Alan was a part-time radio announcer at the local station 2LT – its programming director Bob Jolly recorded their demos in the broadcasting studio. Jolly sent demos to record labels and producers. Festival Records's Pat Aulton was impressed with "See the Way" and had the group re-record it for their debut single. "See the Way" has Alan's "spacey" sounding guitar, which was put through a tape delay to get the effect.

For its B-Side, the group proposed a cover version of a Rolling Stones track. However, Aulton heard Alan practising a riff and recommended building a song around it, which resulted in "I Want, Need, Love You". It is an intense and ground-breaking slab of hard rock and proto-punk, that featured an over-driven instrumental interlude replete with pounding jungle rhythms and a lightning-fast guitar solo by Alan Oloman. The single was released in November 1966 via Festival Music. Both sides were written by Alan Oloman. In a contemporary review by teen newspaper Go-Set, a staff writer rated "See the Way" as C for mediocre and quipped, "[it] leaves us in the dark." Australian musicologist, Ian McFarlane, described the group, "[they] were equally adept at producing both jubilant pop and tough garage-punk on either side of the one single."

Though it failed to reach the national charts, the single was popular around Lithgow and nearby Bathurst. The Black Diamonds had a repertoire of thirty original tracks as well as cover versions. They supported the Easybeats, whose members cited the Black Diamonds as the best opening band they had. They appeared on ABC's TV drama series, Be Our Guest (1966), showing them lip synching to "See the Way" and "I Want, Need, Love You", while standing on a rocky beach. They also appeared on Saturday Date programme. The group encountered difficulties: live shows could be gruelling — at some gigs they were expected to play a four-hour stint, late into the night; promoters and club owners ripped the band off on several occasions; and while on tour they got into scuffles with reactionary youths.

On one occasion we did a show at a civic centre in St Mary's, a western suburb of Sydney, where a gang of hoods turned up. They saw our long hair and fancy clothes, so they stood outside until the show finished and the security had gone home and yelled from outside the hall for us to come out so they could give us a beating. Neil got fed up with this, and walked through the middle of mob to his car and opened the trunk, whereupon he produced a .303 rifle which had been left from a hunting expedition he had made a few days earlier. The hoods quickly scattered.

— Glenn Bland, Hot Generation liner notes, 2003.

Their second single was released in March 1967. Aulton selected their cover version of J. J. Cale's "Outside Looking In" for its A-side – a decision the band members later felt was a mistake. The B-side was the Who-influenced power pop track, "Not This Time", which found them more in their element. For the latter Alan played a home-made 12-string guitar. The single reached the top 30 in Sydney, but failed to chart nationally. Later that year, recently married, Neil left and was replaced by Brian "Felix" Wilkinson on piano and organ. At the end of the year the band moved to Sydney and secured residencies at the Caesar's Palace and Hawaiian Eye discothèques. In 1968 Keogh departed and was replaced on bass guitar by Darcy Rosser.

== Tymepiece years 1968–1971 ==
At the urging of Aulton and Festival Records, the group changed their name to Tymepiece, and signed an extended contract with Festival Records imprint Infinity Records. They issued three singles "Bird in the Tree" (August 1968), "Become Like You" (November 1969) and "Won't You Try" (October 1971). Back in 1968 under the pseudonym, Love Machine, they had also released a cover version of the Tokens' 1961 song, "Lion Sleeps Tonight", which reached the top 10 in Sydney and Brisbane. McFarlane observed, "[it] was a hit, but the band members soon tired of the Love Machine pop trappings and moved on."

In February 1971 as Tymepiece they issued an album, Sweet Release, which featured an eclectic blend of psychedelic pop ("Why?"'), folk ("Reflections"'), country ("`Sweet Release") R&B ("I Love, You Love") and heavy progressive blues ("Shake Off") influences. Soon after the band broke up. In 1974 Alan Oloman joined the Executives on bass guitar. On 9 August 2008 Alan "Olly" Oloman died of cancer, aged 61.

== Legacy ==
The Black Diamonds' work came to the attention of garage rock enthusiasts around the world. Songs such as "I Want, Need, Love You" and "See the Way" have appeared on various vinyl and CD anthologies. The latter was covered by Brisbane rock band, the Screaming Tribesmen, in a live rendition from a 1982 concert on their compilation album, The Savage Beat of the Screaming Tribesmen (2003). Raven Records issued the "pulsating, eight-minute" track, "Shake Off" on their Various Artists compilation album, Golden Miles: Australian Progressive Rock 1969–1974 (1994).

"I Want, Need, Love You" was included on the Down Under Nuggets: Original Australian Artyfacts (1965–67) compilation issued by Festival Records in conjunction with Warner Bros. Records and Rhino Records in 2013. In 1995 Australian garage band, the Hunchbacks, provided their rendition as "Want Need Love You" on an EP, Play to Lose. The track was also covered by American garage rockers, the Dirtbombs, on their album, If You Don't Already Have a Look (2005). "See the Way" was included on the Obscure 60s Garage, Volume 5: Australian Edition compilation. The Black Diamonds are recognised as a trailblazing and innovative group. According to McFarlane, "[they] will be remembered as one of the most ferocious garage/punk outfits Australia ever produced in the 1960s."

== Members ==
Johnny Kett's Black Diamonds 1959–1965

- Johnny Kett (drums)
- Alan Oloman (rhythm guitar)
- Brandt Newton (lead guitar)
- Allan "Banzai" Keogh (guitar, bass)
- Neil Oloman (rhythm guitar)
- Glenn Bland (lead vocals, rhythm guitar)

The Black Diamonds 1965–1967

- Glenn Bland (vocals, harmonica)
- Rihannon Alder (lead Tuba)
- Alan Oloman (lead guitar)
- Neil Oloman (rhythm guitar)
- Allan Keogh (bass, vocals)
- Colin McAuley (drums)

Tymepiece/Love Machine 1968–1971

- Glenn Bland (vocals, harmonica)
- Alan Oloman (lead guitar)
- Brian "Felix" Wilkinson (keyboards)
- Darcy Rosser (bass, vocals)
- Colin McAuley (drums)

== Discography ==
- "See the Way" b/w "I Want, Need, Love You" (Festival FK-1549, November 1966)
- "Outside Looking In" b/w "Not This Time" (Festival FK-1693, March 1967)
