= M. Allen Cunningham =

American novelist

Mark Allen Cunningham is an American author based in Portland, Oregon. His first novel, The Green Age of Asher Witherow, is the story of a young boy growing up in a California coal mining town in the 19th century. The Green Age of Asher Witherow was selected as a number one Book Sense pick in 2004, and was shortlisted for the Booksense Book of the Year Award in 2005. It was published in German translation by Atrium Verlag and released in an audio edition by Audible.com.

In 2007, Cunningham published Lost Son, a novel based on the life and work of the poet Rainer Maria Rilke. His newest novel, Partisans, appeared in 2015, and is presented as a lost manuscript by the writer G.P. Leed.

Cunningham's short stories have appeared in national literary magazines, including The Kenyon Review, The Alaska Quarterly Review, and Glimmer Train, and he has published essays and articles in Tin House, Poets & Writers, The Oregonian, and elsewhere. He has received two artist fellowships from the Oregon Arts Commission (2007 and 2013), an Oregon Literary Fellowship from Literary Arts (2012), a grant from the Regional Arts & Culture Council (2015), and two residencies at the Yaddo Colony (2010 and 2014). His work has been nominated twice for the Pushcart Prize.
