= Bellingham Bay and British Columbia Railroad =

Railroad in Washington state, US

Bellingham Bay and British Columbia Railroad was built in the northwestern part of Washington, between the town of Whatcom, now Bellingham, then to the town of Sumas, to connect with the Canadian Pacific Railway for a continental connection.

== History ==
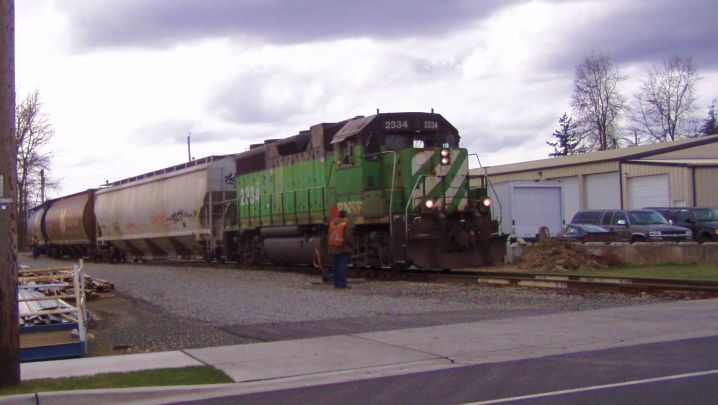
Only remaining portion of the old B.B. & B.C. RR

The company was incorporated in California on June 21, 1883. After the Northern Pacific Railroad chose Tacoma over Whatcom on Bellingham Bay, local railroad boosters along with Pierre B. Cornwall at their head started the B.B. and B.C. Railroad in 1883.

The company was capitalized for $10,000,000, with its aim to build a line from Bellingham (then known as Sehome) to Burrard Inlet now located in Vancouver, British Columbia, Canada, a distance of about 56 miles. The company owned a town site and about 4,000 acres (1,600 ha) in the Bellingham area.

Construction began in 1884 with much activity, then soon slowed. After reaching Whatcom Creek, it headed towards Sumas, Washington, to a connection, also being slowly built in Canada. At that time the Canadian Pacific Railway was working very hard over the Canadian Rockies and down the Fraser Valley.

By 1889, the line was still slowly pushing forward towards the Canada–United States border, while another road, the Fairhaven and Southern Railroad, was pushing south from Fairhaven towards Skagit County and planned a connection with the northbound Northern Pacific Railroad.

But construction soon continued and the road was graded further north with materials en route by ship, and reached the Canada–US border in 1891 and several weeks later the Canadian Pacific Railway reached the border.

More lines were completed and by 1902, lines to Glacier, Washington and Lynden Washington had been built as were other short lines to numerous logging camps. Signs of these old roads can be found throughout the county. Another spur headed east of the former township of Goshen, Washington, crossed the Nooksack River just east of the Mt. Baker highway then crossed the Northern Pacific Railway tracks, through the town of Deming, Washington and ended near the township of Welcome.

The B.B. and B.C. was taken over by the Chicago, Milwaukee and Saint Paul Railway and renamed the Bellingham and Northern in 1912. With the beginning of WWI in 1918, the Chicago, Milwaukee and St. Paul Railway was required to drop the unique names of their many wholly owned subsidiaries and operate them under the parent company's name. The line was used to serve several industries along the line including a limestone mine in Kendall, Washington, a lumber mill in Strandell as well as a farm supply store and two Bellingham Cold Storage plants.

== Burlington Northern Era, 1980-1996 ==
The Milwaukee Road went bankrupt in 1980 with the last day of service coming on March 31 of that same year. All of the former BB&BC/B&N trackage was sold to the Burlington Northern with the latter railroad abandoning most of it.

The Bellingham to Sumas mainline between James Street in Bellingham and the wye in Hampton were abandoned after vandals burned down the bridge that carried the line over the Nooksack River in Everson. The track between the waterfront and James Street was kept in service as an industrial spur to serve Bellingham Cold Storage and Mount Baker Plywood along the waterfront as well as a feed store along the corner of Birchwood Avenue and Meridian Street. This section of track became known as the "Cement Spur".

An additional industrial spur track that originally branched off of the Squalicum Line to serve Portland Cement was also kept in service to serve the aforementioned plant as well as Oeser (a telephone pole furnishing plant) and Meridian Plywood. This track became known as the "Mine Lead".

The remains of the "High Line" were abandoned beyond the yard which continued to receive service.

The track running to Limestone Junction was abandoned beyond the wye that connected it with the Sumas Subdivision. Abandoned track was removed not long after with the exception of the trestles that carried the line over rivers and creeks. The surviving section of track became part of the newly christened Lynden Branch. The track between Sumas and Lynden was kept in service to serve industries in the latter town.

The feed store discontinued rail service sometime in the 1980s. The track was kept intact to serve Bellingham Cold Storage's new potash plant located off of Orchard Street. Meridian Plywood burned down in the mid-1990's and the Mine Lead was abandoned beyond Oeser.

== BNSF Era, 1996- Present ==
The Burlington Northern merged with the Atchison, Topeka, and Santa Fe Railway in 1996 making the newly formed BNSF the new owners of the Cement Spur, Mine Lead and Lynden Branch. The Cement Spur was abandoned beyond Mount Baker Plywood in 1996 after the line washed out. Bellingham Cold Storage purchased the abandoned section of track from the BNSF in 1998 and operated it as the "Bellingham International Railroad". This went until 2004 when the track was once again abandoned due to washouts. The Bellingham International Railroad was filed for abandonment in 2009.

The Bellingham Railroad Museum purchased and refurbished the track between Orchard Street and its termination near James Street in 2011 to run speedercarts. The operation terminated at the end of the year after the city purchased the track to turn it into part of the Bay-to-Baker rail trail. The tracks were removed not long after.

The Lynden Branch serviced six industries when the BNSF took over; three in Sumas and four in Lynden. Industries in Sumas included the Ellenbaas Company, Mountainview Reload and IKO Pacific. Industries in Lynden included Martin's Feed, AmeriCold, Lynden Feed and Darigold.

Desticon Transportation opened in Sumas in the 2000s using the remains of the Milwaukee Road's interchange track into Canada as their industrial lead. Darigold and Lynden Feed terminated rail service in this same decade with the latter going out of business and having their building demolished. Ellenbaas merged with Land O'Lakes in April 2011 to form EPL Feed. Martin's Feed relocated from Lynden to Sumas in 2018 leaving AmeriCold as the sole remaining industry in Lynden. AmeriCold terminated service with the BNSF in late 2019 with the last reefer leaving town on September 11 of that year. The track between the former Hampton wye and Lynden was used in the spring/summer of 2020 as a storage track.

Morse Steel opened in the 1990s and an industrial lead branching off of the Mine Lead was constructed. Said industry received service until the late 2010s.

As of 2025, all four industrial spurs are still in use. The Cement Spur is still in use today to serve Bellingham Cold Storage's waterfront based facility and Mount Baker Products (formerly Mount Baker Plywood). Both industries are serviced on an as needed basis. Mount Baker Products pushes in and pulls out boxcars on their industrial lead using a railcar mover. The BNSF has not run down their industrial lead since the Bellingham International was abandoned. The industrial lead is maintained by a private contractor. Bellingham Cold Storage terminated service in the 2010s but has resigned with the BNSF as of 2020 and receives reefers.

The remains of the High Line are used by the BNSF as a storage yard for maintenance of way equipment. The yard was also used by Amtrak Cascades on two occasions to stage extra trains during the 2010 Winter Olympics and in the summer of 2013 when the Skagit River Bridge on Interstate 5 collapsed.

The Lynden Branch still serves five industries in Sumas: EPL Feed, Arrow Reload, Pacific Rim Reload, an unknown propane dealer and IKO Pacific. EPL Feed ships out fertilizer in hoppers as well as cotton seed in boxcars on occasion. Arrow Reload (formerly Mountainview Reload) ships out lumber on centerbeams. Pacific Rim Reload ships out Rabanco garbage stacks. The unknown propane dealer ships out propane in tankers and also has its industrial lead used to store the power for the Sumas yard switcher. IKO Pacific receives tar in tankers and occasionally ships out shingles in boxcars. The track beyond IKO Pacific is used as a storage track. The active track comes to an end just before Van Buren Road in Clearbrook.

== Remains ==
As of 2025, much of the out of service portions of the line are still in place.

The High Line: Though the crossing at York Street is long gone, the former grade including where the rails were can still be seen. The former right of way between this point and Franklin Street is still in place as a walkway. The overpass carrying the line over I-5 is long gone, but the indents in the concrete walls where the bridge was still remain.

Squalicum Line/Cement Spur: A brief portion of the original point where the line branched off and curved towards the waterfront is still intact. The abandoned Bellingham International Railroad remains mostly intact beyond the Mount Baker Products industrial lead with the exception of crossings at West Street, Meridian Street and Birchwood Avenue being removed as well as a portion of track underneath Northwest Avenue. Some of the track can still be seen on portions of the right of way where it has since been turned into a walking trail. All track beyond the Orchard Street crossing has been removed.

A short trestle that carried the line over Squalicum Creek still exists just past Hannegan Road albeit with tracks removed. Another trestle that also goes over Squalicum Creek exists near the end of Dewey Road. Google Maps still lists track as existing along Roberts Road in Goshen. The track between Hampton Road and the present day Lynden Branch also exists in Hampton.

Mine Lead: A short portion of track that ran towards the Squalicum Line still exists beyond Bell Lumber and Pole. This track parallels the modern day Railroad Trail.

Lynden Branch: The entire out of service portion of the line between Clearbrook and its termination in Lynden remains intact with the exception of a removed industrial lead that served both Darigold and Lynden Feed. The line is still considered active despite being unused since 2020.

Sumas-Glacier Line: Several trestles that carried the line over Saar Creek and other rivers still exist. A series of these trestles just outside of Sumas exist as part of a walking trail at the Cedar Springs Christian retreat. Other trestles and trestle supports also exist on private property between Sumas and Limestone Junction. Beyond Limestone Junction, the supports for the Kendall Creek trestle still exist as well as a support for a bridge that carried the line over the Nooksack River near Glacier. The Glacier depot at the end of the branch still exists today and can be rented as a vacation home.

== Conversion to rail trail ==
The decommissioned rail bed of the B.B. and B.C. is planned to be converted into a rail trail as parts of the Nooksack Loop Trail and the Bay to Baker Trail. Parts of these trails have already been constructed (in particular within the city limits of Bellingham and Everson), but most of the trail is still in the planning stages.

== See also ==
- List of Washington (state) railroads

== Sources ==
- Railroad Commission of Washington, Harry Anson Fairchild (1910). Annual report of the Railroad Commission of Washington, to the ... Vol. 5.
- Washington (State). Governor (1884–1887 : Squire), Watson Carvosso Squire (1886). Resources and development of the territory of Washington: Message and report ... W.T., Lowman & Hanford, stationery and printing company. p. 63.
- Edson, Lelah (Jackson) (1968). The fourth corner: highlights from the early Northwest. Whatcom Museum of History and Art. p. 298.
