= Judsonville, California =

City in California, United States

Coordinates: 37.95971°N 121.81261°W

Judsonville was a city in eastern Contra Costa County, California, United States. It was located 3 miles (4.8 km) northeast of Stewartville. It was a mining town for the nearby coal mines.

A post office operated at Judsonville from 1878 to 1883, with a closure in 1879. The name is in honor of Egbert Judson, part owner of a mine.
