= Somersville, California =

Somersville
- Former settlement
- Location in California Somersville (the United States)
- Coordinates: 37°57′25″N 121°51′52″W
- Country: United States
- State: California
- County: Contra Costa
- Elevation: 741 ft (226 m)

Somersville (also, Sommerville and Summerville) is an unincorporated ghost town in eastern Contra Costa County, California, United States. It is located 6 miles (10 km) north-northeast of Mount Diablo, at an elevation of 741 feet (226 m).

== History ==
Somersville was founded in the 1850s by gold miners. It was named after Francis Somers, who had discovered the Black Diamond Mine. Somersville was home to the Manhattan, Union, Eureka, Pittsburg, and Independent mines. The town is no longer populated and is within the boundaries of the East Bay Regional Park District's Black Diamond Mines Regional Park. Somersville Road was named after the town; it is a major north–south arterial trunk road in the closest existing neighbor city, Antioch. Somersville's ruins have a fairly extensive number of graves in the Rose Hill Cemetery, many of which are those of miners who died in the coal mines. The cemetery was heavily vandalized prior to the East Bay Regional Park District taking it over in the 1970s. The Somersville mines are now sealed to prevent entry, due to frequent incidents of people becoming lost inside them during the mid 20th century.

A post office operated at Somersville from 1863 to 1910.

A reporter for the Antioch Ledger, May 7, 1870, described the town: "...Somersville has four general merchandise stores, one drug store, one hotel, two large boarding houses, several minor ones, a doctor, barber, shoemaker, no tailor, four saloons, pure et simple, not counting liquors dispensed at groceries. As an offset, we have a flourishing Lodge of Good Templars and Sons of Temperance. Odd Fellows and Red Men each have an organization. A Protestant and a Catholic Church shed their humanizing influence around, both being well attended. The public school is maintained nearly all the year round, by special tax when the State fund fails; from seventy-five to one hundred scholars is the average daily attendance. There are two departments, and two lady teachers, under whose painstaking auspices the fundamental branches flourish."

In 1979, Somersville gained fame as the site of the largest historical archaeology excavation ever done in the U.S. at the time. Over 200 students from U.C Berkeley scraped and sifted through the eastern part of the townsite, recovering thousands of artifacts. The Public Broadcasting System examined the project in a 1980 episode of the anthropological documentary series Odyssey, titled "Other People's Garbage".

== See also ==
- Nortonville, a similar nearby ghost town
