= Alvinza Hayward =

American mine-owner and financier (1821–1904)

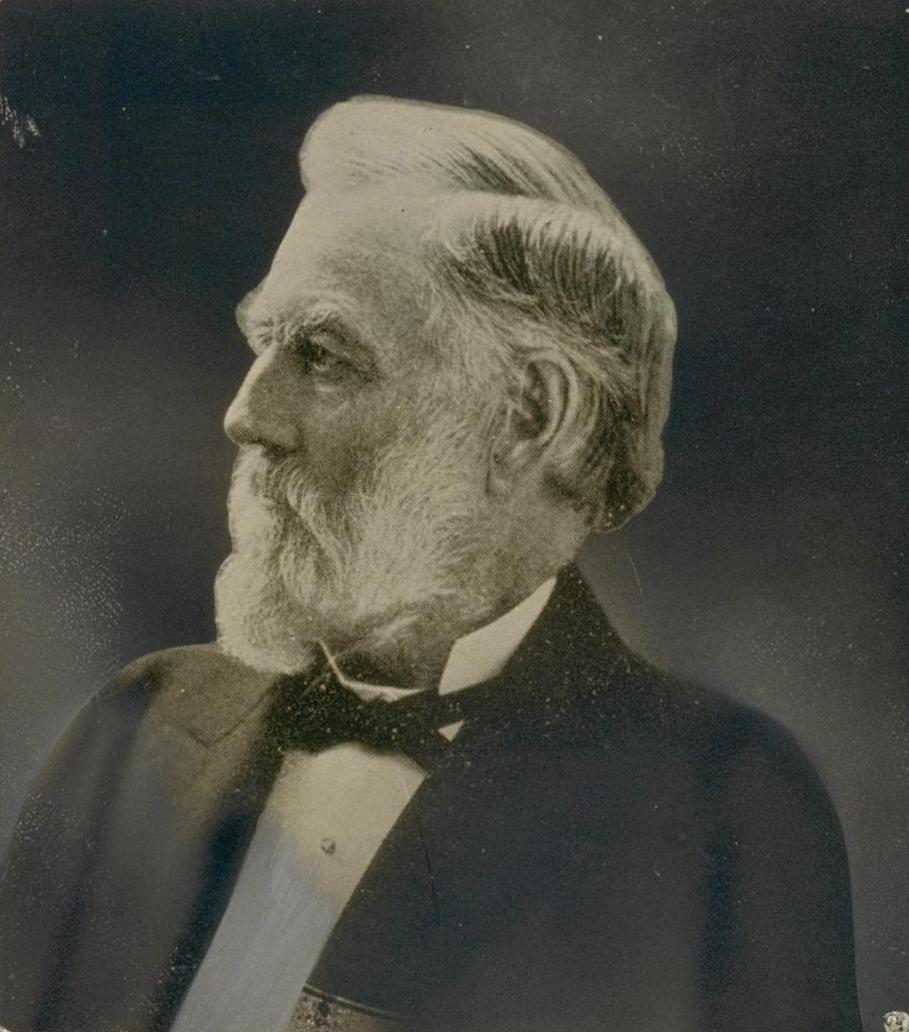
- Born: 1821; Vermont, U.S.
- Died: February 14, 1904 (aged 82–83); San Francisco, California, U.S.
- Resting place: Cypress Lawn Memorial Park
- Occupation(s): Mine-owner, capitalist, businessman, financier
- Known for: Gold mining, silver mining, investing
- Spouse: Charity Hathaway
- Children: 8

Alvinza Hayward (1821 – February 14, 1904) was an American mine-owner, capitalist, businessman, and financier. He was a well-known gold mining millionaire who made his fortune during the California Gold Rush. He lived in the San Francisco Bay Area.

== Early life ==
Born in Vermont in 1821, Hayward moved to Canton, New York, early in his life. He studied law in New York State, but also pursued lumber and lead mining interests in Michigan.

== California ==
His experience in Michigan vein mining proved invaluable after his move to California during the Gold Rush. He moved to Amador County, California in 1851 with his wife and eldest son.

After buying an interest in the Eureka Mine (also known as the Old Eureka Mine) in Amador County, Hayward made new investments and successfully extracted gold where others had failed. He later bought the neighboring operation, Badger Mine and consolidated the companies into Hayward Mine (also known as Amador Mining Company). He is estimated to have mined more than US$12 million worth of gold from his mine, which ran as deep as 1,700 ft. The Old Eureka Mine portion changed hands many times, before its last owner Hetty Green who closed it in 1881.

He also owned the Utica/Selkirk mine near Angels Camp where he mined quartz and gold. In 1901, the near-vertical Utica quartz deposit; twice abandoned, and once believed so unworkable traded hands for just US$50; was said to have yielded the single richest gold deposit in California. After heavy investment, more than $7,000,000 in gold was removed from Utica, and up to $900,000 in gold bullion was extracted in a single month. In later life he mined silver. Hayward was a director and major stockholder of the Bank of California by 1865, and in 1870 he was one of the original investors in the San Francisco City Gas Company, which would eventually become the Pacific Gas and Electric Company.

In 1867, the Union Mill and Mining Company was incorporated after the company had foreclosed, in order to relieve the Bank of California. The charter members of the incorporated mining company included Hayward, as well as, Darius Ogden Mills, William Sharon, William Chapman Ralston, Thomas Bell, Thomas Sunderland, Charles Bonner, and William Eustace Barron.

Hayward was part of a group of men that helped San Francisco's Lone Mountain Cemetery became the Laurel Hill Cemetery around 1867 with the filing of the articles of incorporation, others in the group including William Chapman Ralston, John Parrott, Henry Huntly Haight, Nicholas Luning, James Otis, Henry Mayo Newhall, and C. C. Butler.

Hayward was often called California's "first millionaire," and in his lifetime was frequently referred to as “the richest man in California.” Grandiose and eccentric by turns, Hayward turned even more strongly to Spiritualism and the occult in his later years, using mediums to predict business investments (with poor results).

== Death and legacy ==
He died on February 14, 1904, in San Francisco, California. Hayward is buried in Cypress Lawn Memorial Park in Colma, California.

After Hayward's death, the Hayward Park residence in San Mateo was converted into the Peninsula Hotel. The hotel had burned down in a 1920 fire. In c. 1912, the land was subdivided to create the a neighborhood named "Hayward Park; which also has a Caltrain station stop with the same name. The Hayward Building (also known as Kohl Building, or Alvinza Hayward Building; 1901), designed by architects George Percy and Willis Polk of Percy and Polk, is located at 400 Montgomery Street, San Francisco, and is still standing.

The US Geological Survey Geographic Names Information System states the city of Hayward, California was named after him. This has been disputed by historians.

== Family life ==
Hayward married Charity Hathaway (1826–1905) in Wisconsin in the 1840s. They had a difficult relationship; their first son, James, was born in 1846, and would die of consumption at age 27. They divorced in 1878, the couple remarried again later that year only to separate again, living the rest of their lives apart. Only two of the couple's eight children survived to adulthood; six others died of mysterious respiratory ailments early in life, prompting recent speculation that Charity Hayward may have had a role in their demise.

In 1860s, the Hayward family moved to San Mateo, California. He built Hayward Park (1880), his 800-acre (3.2 km^{2}) Arts and Crafts-style estate, in San Mateo, which included a lake, race track, and deer park.

== See also ==
- List of people associated with the California Gold Rush
