= West Hartley, California =

Unincorporated community in California, United States

West Hartley
- Former settlement
- Location in California West Hartley (the United States)
- Coordinates: 37°56′26″N 121°48′46″W
- Country: United States
- State: California
- County: Contra Costa
- Elevation: 440 ft (134 m)

West Hartley was an unincorporated community in eastern Contra Costa County, California, United States. It was located 7 miles (11 km) northeast of Mount Diablo, at an elevation of 440 feet (134 m). It is now a ghost town. It was a mining town for the nearby coal mines.

It was founded in the late 1880s and named for England's West Hartley coal mine.
