= John Kunkel Small =

American botanist (1869–1938)

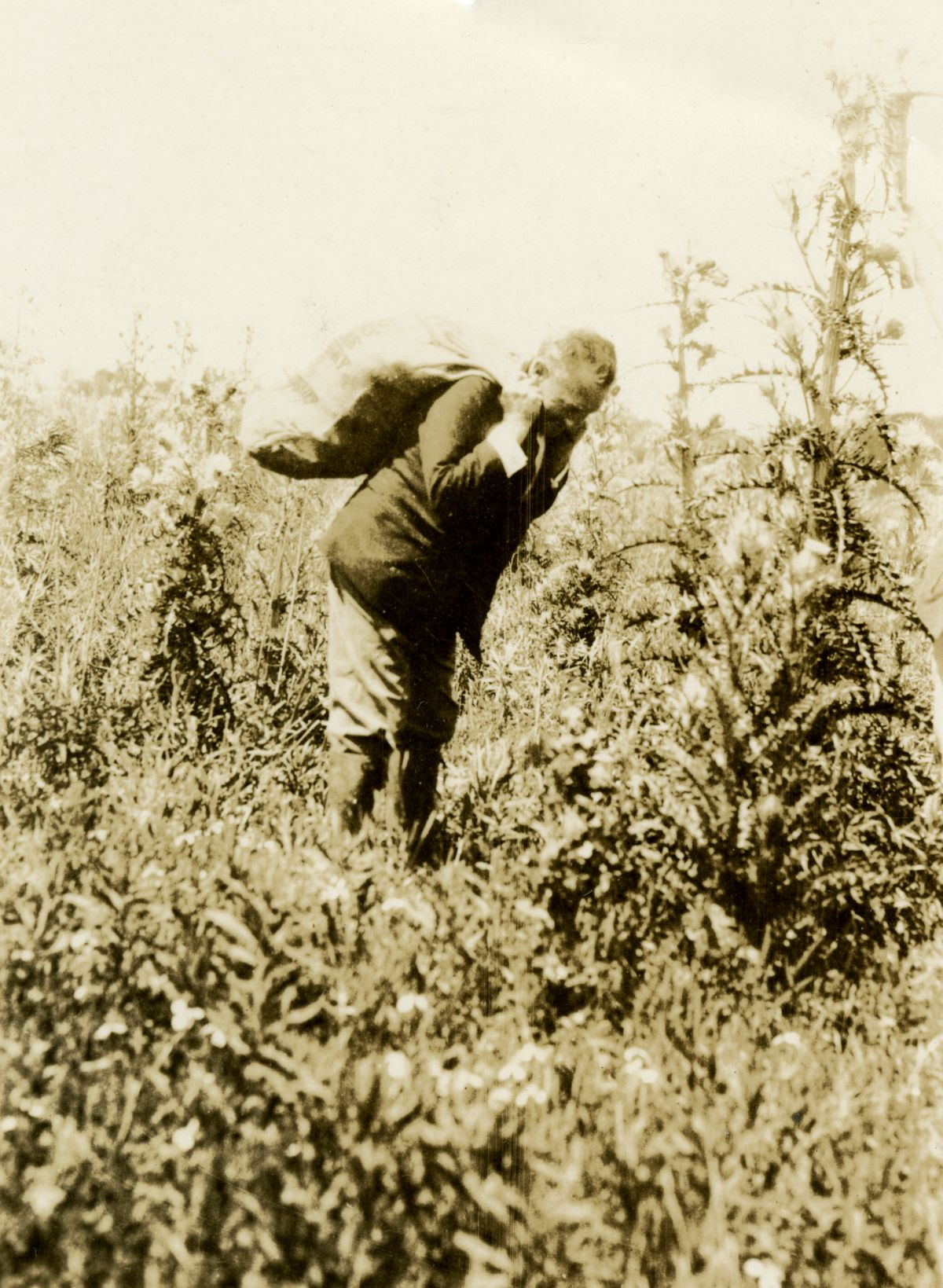
- circa. 1900
- Born: January 31, 1869; Harrisburg, Pennsylvania
- Died: January 20, 1938 (aged 68); The Bronx, New York
- Education: Franklin & Marshall College; Columbia University
- Scientific career
- Fields: Botany
- Workplaces: New York Botanical Garden
- Author abbrev. (botany): Small

John Kunkel Small (January 31, 1869 – January 20, 1938) was a botanist who studied plants in the southeastern United States, published exsiccatae and wrote a book about the deterioration of habitats in Florida. He was from Pennsylvania and brought his family on some of his expeditions.

== Early life and education ==
Small was born on January 31, 1869, in Harrisburg, Pennsylvania. He studied botany at Franklin & Marshall College, receiving his Bachelor's degree in 1892. Then he studied at Columbia University, where he earned a doctorate in philosophy in 1895 and a doctorate in science in 1912.

== Career ==
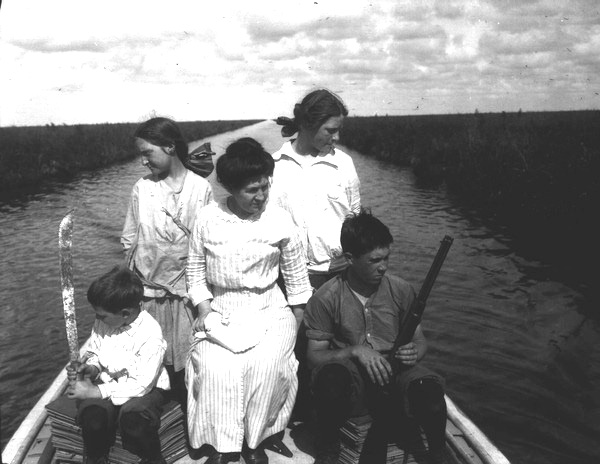
Family of John Kunkel Small in the Florida Everglades near Lake Okeechobee aboard the boat "Lida", 1913. Small frequently brought his family with him on his botanical and ethnographic excursions. From left to right: George K. Small, Kathryn Wheeler Small, Elizabeth Wheeler Small, Elizabeth Small, and John Wheeler Small.

After his first graduation in 1895, he became a special agent for the Georgia Geological Survey. Then, returning to Columbia University, he became the first Curator of Museums at the New York Botanical Garden, a post at which he served from 1898 until 1906. It was mainly at that time of his life when he issued several exsiccatae and exsiccata-like works, among others the series Mosses of the Southern United States, distributed from the Herbarium of Columbia College by John K. Small (1897) and Lichens of Eastern North America (1898). From 1906 to 1934, he was Head Curator, and then from 1934 until his death he was Chief Research Associate and Curator. Small's doctoral dissertation, published as Flora of the Southeastern United States in 1903, and revised in 1913 and 1933, is a detailed floristic reference for much of the South. Assisted by the patronage of Charles Deering, Small traveled extensively around Florida recording plants and land formations.

Small was an early botanical explorer of Florida, documenting many species for the first time, although the flora and fauna were well known to the local Seminole people. His first trip to the region was in 1901. Over the next 37 years, Small visited many times "to collect specimens, to study the natural history of the region, and to photograph natural landscapes, tropical plants, Seminoles and other local folk". Small explored by both car and boat, often bringing along his wife Elizabeth, and their four children.

In 1928, Small worked with Thomas Edison on a project to study ferns in Florida and determine whether a commercially viable natural rubber could be extracted from them.

"Small's botanical research was recorded in 450 published works, mostly articles, and numerous unpublished typescripts. Among his most well-known publications is the book From Eden to Sahara: Florida's Tragedy, which received acclaim in 1929 for documenting the severe deterioration of south Florida's botanical resources that he had observed up to that time."

== Death ==
Small died of heart disease on January 20, 1938, at the age of 68, at his home in the Bronx.

== Bibliography ==
- Small, John Kunkel (1903). Flora of the Southeastern United States. New York: The author.
- Small, John Kunkel (1913). Flora of the Southeastern United States (2nd ed.). New York: The author.
