= Interwar naval service of Erich Raeder =

Erich Johann Albert Raeder (24 April 1876 – 6 November 1960) was a naval leader in Germany before and during World War II. This article covers Raeder's life as the Großadmiral (Grand Admiral) up to the start of World War II. Raeder attained this naval rank, the highest possible, in 1939, becoming the first person to hold that rank since Alfred von Tirpitz. Raeder led the Kriegsmarine (German War Navy) for the first half of the war; he resigned in 1943 and was replaced by Karl Dönitz. He was sentenced to life in prison at the Nuremberg Trials, but was released early due to failing health. Raeder is also well known for dismissing Reinhard Heydrich from the Reichsmarine in April 1931 for "conduct unbecoming to an officer and a gentleman".

== The fall of Zenker and the rise of Raeder ==
In 1927, the Phoebus film studio went bankrupt. Subsequently, bankruptcy proceedings established that the studio was a front company created by Captain Walter Lohmann of the Reichsmarine to obtain nitrate and that the navy had poured millions of Reichsmark to subsidize the financially struggling studio over the last few years. The public outrage centered less around the fact that Navy had established a front company to help violate Versailles, but rather that the Navy had run the Phoebus studio in such an inept manner as to require millions of Reichsmark in secret subsidies to keep it afloat, and even then, the Phoebus studio had still gone bankrupt. These disclosures of his knowledge of this matter and his initial claims of ignorance of Captain Lohmann's activities forced the Defence Minister Otto Gessler to resign in disgrace in January 1928. The commander in chief of the Navy, Admiral Hans Zenker insisted that he knew nothing of the secret subsidies to Phoebus, but his denials grew increasingly unconvincing as 1928 went on, and finally he was told by the President, Field Marshal Hindenburg in September 1928 that he would have to resign for the good of the service. In October 1928, Raeder was promoted to Admiral and made Commander-in-Chief of the Reichsmarine, the Weimar Republic Navy (Chef der Marineleitung). Raeder was appointed C-in-C largely because it was felt by the rest of the admirals' that he was the best man to deal with politicians, and win them over to the Seemachtidelogie. The Defense Minister General Wilhelm Groener disliked Raeder and might have vetoed his nomination, but he wanted Zenker's successor to be someone who was not connected in any way with the Phoebus affair which had become a major embarrassment to the Defense Ministry, which led him to support Raeder as the best man available. Upon taking command, Raeder promptly caused a political storm when during a dinner with leading officers to honor him as the new naval chief, he proposed a toast to the deposed Wilhelm II.

From when he assumed leadership of the Reichsmarine in 1928, Raeder's leadership was extremely authoritarian with no tolerance extended to those whose views differed from his. In 1929, Raeder successfully pressured the Berlin publishing house of E.S. Mitter from publishing a book by Wegener critical of Tirpitz's leadership. Despite Raeder's best efforts to suppress it, another publishing house printed Wegener's book The Naval Strategy of the World War later in 1929. Other officers complained about the way in which Raeder sought to re-write history in the Official History in a way that gloried Tirpitz with no regard to what actually happened with Admiral Assemann of the Historical Branch complaining to Raeder: "I am convinced that it makes no difference to you Herr Admiral, what we write ... We must only write in such a way that you have peace with the old admirals". In 1937, Raeder banned a study of the Navy in World War I critical of Tirpitz because "it is unconditionally necessary to hold back all publications contra Tirpitz". In private, Raeder was prepared to admit that Tirpitz had made mistakes, but to do so publicly was anathema to him as would mean damaging the mystique of the "Tirpitz cult" that Raeder believed essential to maintain the prestige of the Navy. Raeder's strong authoritarian tendencies came to the fore as soon he assumed command of the Reichsmarine in 1928 when he sent out a circular making clear that dissent would not be allowed while at the same time carrying out the "great seal hunt" of 1928–29 when Raeder forced most of the senior admirals into early retirement in order to promote men who were loyal to him.

== Political role ==
In October 1928, Raeder was cross-examined by a Reichstag committee investigating secret rearmament and violations of the Treaty of Versailles. Raeder testified that he had frequently violated the Versailles treaty, but denied any intention of aggressive war. With considerable help from the President Paul von Hindenburg and the Defence Minister General Wilhelm Groener and Kurt von Schleicher, Raeder succeeded in pressuring the S.P.D. government of Hermann Müller into approving spending for the "pocket battleships" despite the fact that the SPD had elected in the May 1928 Reichstag elections on a platform of stopping the "pocket battleship" project. Hindenburg, Groener, and Schleicher as former or current Army officers did not care much for Raeder's navalist plans, but feared that allowing the SDP to stop the Panzerschiffe would create a dangerous example that might one day wreck the Army's budget plans. Raeder's testimony had been intended to help clear the consciences of Müller and other S.P.D ministers who were planning to perform a policy U-turn on the "pocket battleships" by stressing that he was supposedly not returning to the policy of Tirpitz and aggressive navalism. The approval of the "pocket battleship" programme by the government in November 1928 was largely due to pressure from the Reichswehr, which formed a "state within the state", and was a major blow to German democracy in that the military successfully pressured the government into approving something that it had been elected in order to stop; in effect the military claimed the right on matters of national defence to overrule the elected politicians. Right from the beginning when he assumed command of the Reichsmarine in 1928, Raeder waged a skilful public relations battle highly reminiscent of and closely modelled after the campaigns of Tirpitz in the early 20th century to convince both the politicians and the German public of the importance of sea power to Germany's future greatness. Raeder's efforts were welcomed, but not many officers complained in private that Raeder lacked Tirpitz's flair and understanding of the public.

Raeder always saw his role as much political as naval. Raeder was keenly aware that the Army was the senior service and that many in Germany took the view that because the great High Seas Fleet that Tirpitz had built had done almost nothing in World War I that it would be a waste of money and time to attempt to rebuild Tirpitz's fleet. Because of the High Seas Fleet mutiny of 1918, the right distrusted the navy as a hotbed of revolution, treason and mutiny while because of the Kapp putsch of 1920 the left distrusted the navy as a hotbed of counter-revolution, treason and putsche; accordingly in the 1920s neither right-wing or left-wing parties were in favour of improving the Navy's budget. For Raeder, convinced as he was that sea power was the key to national greatness to merely sit back and wait for the politicians to come understand the importance of sea power was never an option, and hence his non-stop lobbying for a bigger naval budget. Raeder did not care for the "pocket battleships" programme that had been launched in 1928, in private calling the Panzerschiffe an unfortunate design forced by Versailles and much preferred to build large capital ships. Raeder only supported the "pocket battleships" as a way of keeping German shipyards busy and as the only way of improving the naval budget until such time as Germany would overthrow the provisions of the Treaty of Versailles, and start building the capital ships that Versailles had outlawed. For Raeder, the Panzerschiffe had only two roles to play:

- Raeder feared that because of Versailles that German shipbuilding skills were starting to become enfeebled, and that unless German shipbuilders received major contracts German naval technology would fall behind.
- Ever since the Washington conference of 1921–22 which had led to the naval arms limitation treaty of 1922, the world's leading naval powers had systemically classified warships into various specific types in order to control naval spending. By designing deliberately the "pocket battleship" that had combined elements of a battleship and a cruiser, Germany was disrupting the Washington system, which Raeder hoped that would lead the other powers to allow Germany to have capital ships in exchange for abandoning the Panzerschiffe.
- Raeder hoped that the revolutionary design for the Panzerschiffe combinding elements of a battleship and cruiser would lead to a surge of national pride in the Reichsmarine, which would create navalist feelings amongst the German public, which in turn would force the politicians to increase the naval budget.

As a sign of his thinking for the future, all of the war plans that Raeder drew up from 1929 onwards for war in the future assumed that the Navy would go to war with regular capital ships instead of the "pocket battleships". For the present, the first war plan that Raeder drew up in January 1929 stated that there was nothing that the Reichsmarine could do to stop a French fleet from entering the Baltic. Raeder used that assessment to argue for more spending on the Navy. In war plans that Raeder drew up in 1931–32 stated that the Reichsmarine would start a war with a surprise attack on the Polish naval base of Gdynia that was intended to destroy the Polish Navy and would then attack French ships in the North Sea before they could enter the Baltic. In a report in November 1932, Raeder stated he needed umbau (rebuilding) programme of one aircraft carrier, six cruisers, six destroyer flotillas, sixteen U-boats and six battleships to allow Germany to control both the Baltic and North Seas.

== Naval "family": Raeder's values ==
Raeder was described as an ultra-conservative by the American historian Charles Thomas, who wrote that Raeder's core values were authoritarian, traditionalist and devoutly Lutheran. Raeder took the view that the Navy should be a "family" with himself as the stern, but loving father figure, and the sailors as his "children", from whom he expected unconditional obedience. Raeder's traditionalism meant that honouring tradition and history played a huge role in the Navy under his leadership, with both officers and men encouraged to think of themselves at all times as part of an elite with a glorious history. Raeder's traditionalism, which in practice meant honoring the traditions of the Imperial Navy together with his close association with the Kaiser and his younger brother Prince Heinrich of Prussia and that he always respectfully described Wilhelm II as the "originator of German sea power" led many to conclude that he was a monarchist, but Raeder in fact had abandoned his monarchism after 1918. Wilhelm II was regarded as such a poor war leader that Raeder argued that even if it were possible, restoring the monarchy would still be undesirable. Raeder never accepted democracy, but his views towards the Weimar Republic changed after the election of Field Marshal Paul von Hindenburg as president in 1925 with Raeder arguing that the "change of leadership" was for the best. In 1927, when Hindenburg visited Kiel, Raeder-who always prided himself on controlling his emotions-almost broke down with tears of joy when he met Hindenburg. As a devout Lutheran who as captain of the Cöln in World War I personally conducted services on the deck of his cruiser, Raeder sought to make Christianity as much part of the lives of his men as possible. Raeder made it clear to his officers that he wanted them to be model Christian gentlemen, and that an officer who did not attend church on a regular basis would have little chance of promotion under his leadership. As part of his role as the self-appointed "father" of the Navy, Raeder was obsessed with the sex lives of his men, giving a dishonourable discharge to any officer or sailor who was found to have engaged in premarital or extramarital sex. In this way, Raeder made a future powerful enemy when in 1931, he discharged a young Reinhard Heydrich after he got his girlfriend pregnant and then married another woman. Heydrich later became chief of the SD, and he sought revenge for his disgrace by engaging in petty harassment of Raeder.

== Rebuilding the German navy ==
=== From Weimar to the Third Reich ===
From 1929 to 1933, Raeder was obsessed with the belief that the KPD was seeking to organize a mutiny in the Navy. In 1929, there was an incident on the cruiser Emden, which while in port in a visit to Colombia, a group of sailors had a party during which they wrapped red headbands around their heads and sang the Internationale while being very rude to their officers after they complained about the amount of noise. This incident received much sensationalized and exaggerated press coverage in Germany where it was claimed that an attempted mutiny had occurred on the Emden, and which Raeder apparently took more seriously than he did the reports from his own officers. The German Communist newspaper Rote Fahne had published an article about the Emden incident and at the same time praised the High Seas mutinies of 1917 and 1918, and stated that it would be wonderful if something along those lines happened again. From these, Raeder believed that Communists were seeking a mutiny, and he spent the next years on a "witch-hunt" for Communists in the Navy, giving a dishonourable discharge to any sailor who had any association with the KPD. Further fanning Raeder's anti-Communist paranoia were the discovery of several secret KPD cells in the navy in 1931 and 1932. Given his fears of the Communists, Raeder welcomed the rise of the NSDAP in the early 1930s as a counter-weight to the KPD. Raeder used his old college Admiral Magnus von Levetzow, who worked as Adolf Hitler's naval adviser in the late 1920s and early 1930s to leak Reichsmarine material to the Nazis out of hope that this might win the Nazis over to navalism. At the same time, it was becoming evident that much of the naval officers corps, especially the younger officers were falling under National Socialist influence, to which Raeder reacted cautiously. In 1932, when the Navy's chief chaplain, Pastor Friedrich Ronneberger urged in his sermons that everyone pray for Hitler's victory in the presidential election that spring, Raeder sent him a letter politely reminding him that the Navy was supposed to be neutral on political issues, and asking him to keep his political opinions out of his sermons.

In April 1932, when the Defence Minister General Wilhelm Groener decided to ban the SA as a threat to public order, Raeder strenuously objected to the ban, arguing that it was the Reichsbanner and the rest of the left-wing paramilitary groups that should be banned instead, and claimed right-wing paramilitary groups like the SA were essential to save Germany from Communism. The American historian Keith Bird wrote that nothing illustrated Raeder's right-wing, authoritarian outlook and his basic antipathy to the Weimar Republic better than his desire to ban the Reichsbanner, which existed for the defence of Weimar and his opposition to banning the SA, which existed for the destruction of Weimar. After the government of Heinrich Brüning banned the SA, General Kurt von Schleicher who was even more vehemently opposed to the ban than was Raeder, started a successful campaign to remove Groener. Raeder refused Schleicher's attempts to involve him in his intrigues against Groener, stating that attempts to involve the Navy overtly in politics like the Kapp putsch had been disastrous for naval expenditures in the 1920s, and that he would not risk future naval budgets by becoming involved in plots against the Defence Minister. Raeder made it clear that the Navy would support whatever government that was in power. When Schleicher brought down Groener in May 1932, Groener made a point in his resignation speech of praising Raeder for his "correct" behaviour as opposed to Army officers like former protégé Schleicher who had undermined his leadership and plotted against him. On 16 June 1932, the new government of Franz von Papen, much to the satisfaction of the service chiefs lifted the ban on the SA and the SS.

In the early 1930s, Raeder fought hard for increased naval budgets, lobbying politicians incessantly to argue that a strong navy was the prerequisite for Germany to become a world power. Such was the degree of Raeder's lobbying for bigger naval budgets that in early 1932, General von Schleicher, who viewed Raeder as a threat to the Army budget attempted to discredit Raeder by leaking a story in the press that Raeder was plotting to oust Groener to be defence minister, with the additional twist that Raeder was alleged to think that Groener was too conservative, and wanted to become Defense Minister to move the armed forces to the left. There was at least some truth to Schleicher's claim about Raeder's interest in becoming Defense Minister, through not the claim Raeder was on the left. In a letter to Levetzow on 5 May 1932 Raeder criticised Groener as indifferent to sea power and for banning the SA, and stated he was willing to resign as Navy C-in-C to become Defense Minister, writing that: "If a strong Reich cabinet appears possible, I am potentially ready to participate". Raeder wrote that he would only join a government with the National Socialists in the Cabinet, that was committed to the Seemachtideologie, and give him control over both services. Raeder's relations with General von Schleicher which had been on decline since 1929 were especially strained by the World Disarmament Conference in Geneva. The German delegation asked for Gleichberechtigung ("equality of status", i.e. doing away with Part V of Versailles which had disarmed Germany) as soon as the conference opened in February 1932. Through the other powers did not concede Germany Gleichberechtigung "in principle" until December 1932, they were willing to negotiate the end of Parts V and VI of Versailles and German rearmament, through just how far German rearmament could go was left unclear. It was clear from early 1932 that it was a question of when Germany was going to rearm, not if, and Raeder was determined to make the most of the opening. In a June 1932 letter to Levetzow, Raeder expressed his "enthusiasm" for the "national government" of Papen that was demanding gleichberechtigung, and urged the Nazis join the Papen government. At the same time, Raeder complained of Schleicher's influence, which led him to promote the interests of the Army at the World Disarmament Conference at the expense of the Navy with Raeder charging that Schleicher was only too willing to place limits on German naval strength in order to get Anglo-American support for Gleichberechtigung for the Army. Realising that the politically powerful General von Schleicher-who was now the Defense Minister in the Papen government-could not be outmaneuvered, Raeder in the fall of 1932 chose to compromise by agreeing to scale back the Navy's more extreme demands on the budget while getting Schleicher to agree to support the Navy's plans to expand beyond Versailles. Many naval officers felt that Raeder's "modest plan" of November 1932 gave too much of the budget to the Army, but Raeder argued that it was best that could be done. The power of General von Schleicher was demonstrated in December 1932 when his intrigues brought down the Papen government-the third time since 1930 his plotting had destroyed a government-and he became Chancellor.

Raeder was deeply hostile to the Weimar Republic, which he viewed as the work of the "internal enemy" responsible for the November Revolution of 1918 and defeat in World War I. Raeder believed that the necessary prerequisite for Germany to become a world power was the end of democracy. Raeder wanted to see the replacement of democracy with an authoritarian, militaristic regime that in Raeder's analogy ensure that Germany would become "one family" united behind the same goals of world power, or as Raeder put it in 1932 Germany needed a "unified Volk" led by one strong leader to win the next war. The American historian Keith Bird wrote about Raeder's thinking about the role of the military, state and society:

"For Raeder, the military and the navy in particular could not have a firm foundation unless they were grounded in the people: "A military must stand in close relationship with the people whom they serve and cannot lead its own existence". A unified Germany represented the absolute precondition for the re-establishment of sea power, which of course assumed overcoming the conditions of the Versailles treaty. Raeder's efforts to create a naval "family" reflected a social, if not socialistic orientation. These elements, along with the Navy's long-term Anglophobia and antidemocratic posture and its belief that Germany's and the navy's defeat in World War I had been the result of a "stab in the back" formed its revisionist outlook from 1918 to 1933."

In November 1932, much to Raeder's delight, the Chancellor Franz von Papen approved of his plans to expand the Navy beyond the limits imposed by the Treaty of Versailles, submitting an Umbau (rebuilding) programme to the Reichstag based on what Raeder had requested. From 1928 onwards, Raeder used his close friend, the retired Admiral Magnus von Levetzow who had become a Nazi, as his contact with Adolf Hitler. Through Raeder approved of Hitler as a man who believed that it was necessary for Germany to achieve "world power status", he disapproved of Hitler's proposed means of attaining it. Raeder was greatly dismayed by Hitler's criticism of Tirpitz and of the pre-1914 Anglo-German naval race, and of his statements that if he came to power, he would reach an understanding with Britain, whereby Germany would "renounce" naval and colonial ambitions in exchange for British support of German ambitions in Eastern Europe. In 1932, Raeder often used Levetzow, who was a Nazi Reichstag deputy, to convoy messages to Hitler that he and the rest of the Navy were disappointed that Hitler did not see the necessity of sea power as a prerequisite for world power, and had even worse ordered the Nazi Reichstag delegation to vote against the Papen government's umbau (rebuilding) programme for the Navy in November 1932. In an interview with the Nazi newspaper Völkischer Beobachter, Hitler stated that Germany's enemies were Poland and the Soviet Union and that Britain should be treated as a potential ally. As such, Hitler argued what was needed was a strong Army to support expansion into Eastern Europe, and building a strong Navy was a waste of money. In a letter to Levetzow, Raeder declared:

"Hitler's contentions concerning rearmament and capital ships are among the silliest that he has come up with yet. How can the man disrupt foreign policy in so criminal a manner and jeopardize all the plans we have made, only to attack Papen? ... What Hitler says about the Baltic and North Sea is really nonsense. If we were to follow him we would build a coastal defense force and would never be able to act against the French. Very soon our mission will once again be in the North Sea. One cannot remodel a navy overnight. He ought to leave negotiations with England to us and not act like a bull in the china shop. Aboard the Cöln he spoke quite differently".

Through Raeder was angry with the Nazis for voting against the Papen government's Umbau which Raeder called "criminal", in a letter to Levetzow on 8 December 1932 Raeder expressed hope that the recent defection of Gregor Strasser would not cause the collapse of the NSDAP which Raeder called the best defense against Communism. Raeder argued that the best thing that could happen was for the National Socialists to join the Schleicher government in order to "tame" Hitler while enabling the "positive" elements of the NSDAP to support "national feeling".

In 1933, Raeder welcomed the coming to power of Hitler, believing that this was the beginning of the militarized Volksgemeinschaft that would let Germany become the world's greatest power. Through Raeder had doubts about Hitler's commitment to navalism, the banning of the SPD and KPD together with the militarist and ultra-nationalist tone of the new regime were appealing to him. Raeder first met Hitler on 2 February 1933 when Hitler delivered a birthday speech for the Foreign Minister Konstantin von Neurath. During the speech, Hitler declared that his foreign policy was to "overthrow" Versailles as the prelude to the "conquest of Lebensraum in the East and its ruthless Germanization". Raeder was later at Nurmberg to claim that he was not paying attention when Hitler declared his ultimate foreign policy goals. On 21 March 1933, Raeder attended the "Day of Potsdam", an elaborate ceremony at the tomb of Frederick the Great where Hindenburg formally declared Hitler the heir to Prussian traditions, which left the conservative Raeder greatly impressed with Hitler's respect for Prussian traditions. On 28 March 1933, Raeder met with the Defence Minister, General Werner von Blomberg, to press for increased naval spending, but though Blomberg was sympathetic, Raeder complained that Blomberg was too much a Prussian Army officer with only a continental understanding of war, leading Raeder to believe that his only hope was to convert Hitler to the Seemachtideologie. At a speech on 1 April 1933 at the launching of the Admiral Scheer, Raeder expressed his support for "the government of the National Revolution" which he hoped would "lead a unified people, thoroughly imbued with the spirit of the great chancellor [Bismarck] to new heights". Shortly afterwards, Raeder had his first private meeting with Hitler, and came away impressed, believing that if Hitler was no navalist, then he could be made into one just like his mentor Tirpitz had converted Wilhelm II to navalism. As part of his efforts to model himself after "the Master", the Immediatstellung (informal meeting) in the hallways which had been such an important part in the relationship between Tirpitz and Wilhelm II was to be an equally important part of the Raeder-Hitler relationship. Raeder believed that if he could "educate" Hitler about the importance of sea power, then he would assure the creation of the greatest fleet ever in German history. Raeder was to spend the rest of the 1930s lobbying Hitler for bigger and bigger naval budgets while trying to win Hitler over to the Seemachtideologie. Raeder, who had a high opinion of himself, started in this period to call himself the "second Tirpitz" who would exceed even "the Master" by achieving what Tirpitz had failed to achieve, the coveted "world power status" for Germany.

=== "Navy style" ===
Raeder's paternalist, authoritarian style meant that as the Navy expanded in the 1930s, he tried to keep as firm control as possible over the lives of his men. Raeder was at all times concerned with promoting the "Navy style", namely an ethos of conduct that he expected his men in the naval "family" to live by, and which led him to treat his men almost as children in need of his paternalist guidance. In June 1935, Raeder followed up a suggestion of the War Minister von Blomberg that officers tried to refrain from carrying briefcases to and from work to avoid the impression that Wehrmacht was becoming bureaucratised by ordering that Blomberg's briefcase order be repeated every spring and fall so that new officers would know how to create the right impression with the public. In the same way, Raeder ordered that naval officers were not to wear monocles or wear a raincoat except on days when it was likely to rain because he wanted his officers to always look their best on every day, and he felt that wearing a raincoat and/or monocle did not look seemingly. In 1935, Raeder was so enraged when he saw one of his officers smoking a pipe when he was driving that he issued an order that this "deplorable state of affairs" cease at once, and officers were never to smoke while driving. In February 1939, Raeder banned anyone in the Kriegsmarine from performing a popular new dance called the "Lambeth Walk", which Raeder claimed was inappropriate for the Navy.

=== "Self-Gleichschaltung": The Navy's place in the Nazi state ===
Raeder generally resisted attempts by the NSDAP to establish influence within the Navy, though he much preferred compromise rather than confrontation whenever possible. On 28 August 1933, Raeder ordered that the Reichsmarine return the greeting "Heil Hitler" when offered and on 6 September 1933 ordered that the "German greeting", as the Nazi salute was officially known, be used by the Navy under certain conditions. The status of chaplains within the Navy was one of the few areas where Raeder did resist the attempts of the NSDAP in an aggressive manner, making clear his absolute opposition to introducing Nazi neo-paganism into the Navy, and that he would never tolerate neo-pagan rituals in the Navy. Raeder was especially opposed to giving chaplain status to the neo-pagan "German Faith Movement" because his arch-enemy Reinhard Heydrich was sponsoring it, and he believed that allowing neo-pagan chaplains was a "Trojan Horse" intended to allow Heydrich's people into the Kriegsmarine. A more dramatic instance occurred in 1934 when Raeder together with Army leadership made it clear to Hitler that they were opposed to the plans of Ernst Röhm to absorb the military into the SA, and that they would block Hitler's plans to assume the powers of the presidency if the ambitions of Röhm went unopposed. Raeder was aware in advance at least in a general sense of the plans for the Night of the Long Knives that saw Röhm and the most of the SA leadership executed.

At the same time as Raeder resisted inclusions by the NSDAP and its related organisations into the Navy, Raeder worked to promote Nazi ideology as opposed to the NSDAP in the Navy, ordering in September 1936 that all officers read a tract by Kriegsmarine Commander Siegfried Sorge called Der Marineoffizier about what it took to be a good officer. Sorge had claimed that one could not be a good naval officer without believing in National Socialist values. Sorge praised Hitler for the Night of the Long Knives, and claimed that if Hitler had been leader in 1918, then the High Seas Fleet mutiny would have been crushed just like Hitler had crushed the alleged SA mutiny of 1934. Sorge used the examples of Julius Caesar and Ferdinand Magellan using brutal methods to crush mutinies to argue that great leaders throughout history had always used extreme violence to maintain discipline, and though he emphasized that a good officer should never have to be confronted with the threat of mutiny, but if such a threat did emerge, the best thing that could be done was to follow Hitler's example in 1934, and have all the mutineers summarily executed. Der Marineoffizier ended with the claim that combating "Jewish materialism" was one of a good officer's principal duties, and this was best done by making "... Germans energetic and thankful followers of the Führer", and help them "... understand that the Führer also had to use a heavy hand ... in order to accomplish his fantastic aim". Through Raeder never joined the N.S.D.A.P, maintaining throughout his life that he was "above politics", in 1937, Hitler awarded Raeder the Golden Party Badge to honour him for his work in promoting National Socialism in the Kriegsmarine. In his memoirs, Raeder claimed that he kept the Navy "strictly aloof" from National Socialism, having maintained "disinterested service to the State" and "independence" from the Nazism. The American historian Keith Bird wrote that if Raeder's claims after 1945 that he resisted efforts to introduce National Socialism in the Navy were true, then it would have been very unlikely that Hitler would have awarded Raeder the Golden Party Badge, which was not a military award, but rather a political award given to those that had done the most for National Socialism. Starting in the mid-1930s, both the Army and the Navy, as part of an effort to preserve their traditional "state within the state" status, began to more and more Nazify themselves in a paradoxical effort to persuade Hitler that it was not necessary to end the traditional "state within the state", to prevent Gleichschaltung being imposed by engaging in what can be called a process of "self-Gleichschaltung". For Raeder, efforts to promote Nazi ideology within the Kriegsmarine had the effect of preserving the autonomy of the Navy, and thus his own power from the N.S.D.A.P by showing Hitler that the Navy did not need to be brought under the control of the N.S.D.A.P. As part of his efforts to prove the loyalty of the Navy to the Nazi regime, Raeder together with the rest of the Navy took the Hitler oath in August 1934.

Reinhard Heydrich, the chief of the SD who had not forgiven Raeder for dishonorably discharging him in 1931, emerged as Raeder's greatest enemy in the Third Reich. Heydrich often engaged in petty harassment of Raeder such as having his telephone tapped and spreading rumors that Raeder was a secret anti-Nazi who refused to discharge Jews from the Navy. In his memoirs, Raeder called Heydrich the man who gave him the "greatest trouble" and complained that he had to spend a disproportionate amount of his time going to Heinrich Himmler to lodge complaints against Heydrich. In 1934, Heydrich attempted to win control over the Abwehr, as the intelligence service of the Defence Ministry was known, which was headed by naval Captain Conrad Patzig, as a way of discrediting Raeder. In October 1934, when Heydrich revealed to Blomberg that the Abwehr had carried out aerial photography of the Maginot Line despite Blomberg's orders to the contrary, Blomberg fired Patzig. Through Raeder personally disliked Admiral Wilhelm Canaris, stating "I cannot work with that man!", he nominated Canaris to be Patzig's successor as the only way of keeping the Abwehr headed by a naval officer and out of Heydrich's control. By early 1935, tensions between the military and the SS were such that rumors of another Night of the Long Knives were starting to swirl, leading Hitler himself to intervene with a speech on 3 January 1935 praising the military that defused the crisis.

Raeder was not a radical anti-Semite along Nazi lines, but he shared the widespread anti-Semitic prejudices of most German conservatives of the time, viewing Jews as an alien element who were corrupting the otherwise pure German Volk. In 1934, when a veteran of the Imperial Navy who was working as a Prussian civil servant, whose job was threatened because his "non-Aryan" status wrote to Raeder for his help, Raeder replied that he could not intervene in a civilian matter. At the same time, Raeder received a letter from an engineer named Dekow who complained that he had been sacked from his job at Deutsche Werke shipyard in Kiel in 1929 because of his membership in the N.S.D.A.P, Raeder replied that he would do everything in his power to help Dekow provided that Dekow provided proof that he was an especially distinguished "Old Fighter"; Dekow provided the evidence and duly received back his job. In February 1934 the Defence Minister Werner von Blomberg, on his own initiative, had all of the Jews serving in the Reichswehr and Reichsmarine given an automatic and immediate dishonourable discharge. Like the Army, the Navy had an unofficial policy long before 1933 of refusing to accept Jews as officers, and of refusing to accept Jews in any capacity as much as possible so the numbers affected by Blomberg's order were very small. Most of the men who were discharged did not practice Judaism as a religion, but since Blomberg defined Jews as a "race", the discharged were mostly either Jewish converts to Christianity or sons of converts to Christianity. As a result, 74 Jewish soldiers and sailors lost their jobs for no other reason than they were considered Jewish. To create a "Jew-free" Navy, Raeder dishonourably discharged three officers, four officer candidates, three NCOs and four sailors. The Law for the Restoration of the Professional Civil Service had excluded those Jews who were World War I veterans, so Blomberg's discharge order was going beyond what was asked of him in promoting anti-Semitism. Raeder made no protest against Blomberg's order, and instead worked with dispatch to carry it out. Raeder accepted without complaint orders from von Blomberg on 21 May 1935 that those who were of "non-Aryan descent" would not be permitted to join the Wehrmacht and all members of the Wehrmacht could only marry women of pure "Aryan descent" and another order from Blomberg in July 1935 saying no member of the Wehrmacht could buy from a store owned by "non-Aryans" under any conditions. At the same time, Raeder fought Blomberg's attempts to have officers who were Mischling or were married to Mischling dishonourably discharged. Raeder's biographer, Keith Bird, wrote about Raeder's anti-Semitism:

"Raeder's adoption of Nazi racial epithets, reflective of the assimilation of the tenets of National Socialism in the Wehrmacht, indicate his ongoing readiness to interpret and moderate Hitler's policies and ideology and assimilate them into his own Pan-German conservative world-view. By intermingling them with the ideology of the late nineteenth century Bismarckian century, he could more easily accept them. At his Nuremberg trial, reflecting the traditional anti-Semitic bias of the German middle class and naval officers of his generation, he argued that after the experience of 1917 and 1918, "International Jewry" had "gained an excessively large and oppressive influence in German affairs", and "one could not be surprised that the National Socialist government tried to loosen and, as far as possible remove this large and oppressive influence." Although Raeder was not anti-Semitic in the virulent National Socialist sense, he tolerated statements from his senior officers such as Admiral Schuster (appointed by Raeder as the inspector of education and training) who told new recruits in 1937 that they must be "racially and morally sound.".

In a speech given on Heroes' Day on 12 March 1939, Raeder praised Hitler:

"... for the clear and unmerciful declaration of war against Bolshevism and International Jewry [Raeder is referring to the Kristallnacht pogrom here], whose drive for destruction of peoples we have felt quite enough in our racial body".

In January 1933, Raeder told the future Luftwaffe general Ulrich Kessler that he should never be "indifferent" to Jews, but had to "hate" them. In contrast to his indifference to what was happening to the Jews, the conscience of the pious Lutheran Raeder was often troubled by the anti-Christian tendencies of the Nazi regime. Raeder believed that the attacks on Christianity were the work of a few radicals in the N.S.D.A.P. and that Hitler himself was a good Christian. Raeder severed his once close friendship with Pastor Martin Niemöller after Niemöller rejected his advice to stay clear of "politics" and accept the application of the Aryan paragraph to the Lutheran church.

=== Vision of the future navy ===
A close protégé of Admiral Alfred von Tirpitz, Raeder focused all of his efforts on rebuilding the High Seas Fleet that had scuttled itself at Scapa Flow in 1919. The Canadian historian Holger Herwig wrote that for Raeder: "The ideal weapon with which to attain sea power remained the symmetrical battle fleet centred around the battleship". Raeder was a firm battleship man who was very hostile towards submarines and aircraft carriers. The American historians Williamson Murray and Alan Millett called Raeder the "ultimate battleship admiral". For Raeder, the bigger the battleship the better, and throughout his tenure as a Commander-in-Chief, Raeder was forever pressuring naval architects to design bigger and bigger battleships; by 1937, Raeder was planning on building 100,000-ton battleships. Raeder dismissed carriers as "petrol tankers", argued that aviation had a small role to play in naval warfare and had little use for submarines, ordering that battleship construction should have first priority over submarines in German ship-yards. Largely because of Raeder's building priorities, Germany went to war in 1939 with 26 ocean-going U-boats. In a 1934 memo, Raeder spelled out why he considered sea power so important to Germany:

"The scale of a nation's world power status is identical with its scale of sea power".

Following the Riskflotte (Risk Fleet) theories of Tirpitz, Raeder argued to Hitler that the Navy had two political purposes to play, which made the Navy indispensable to his foreign policy, namely its "risk" value and "alliance" value. Raeder contended to Hitler that on one hand an extremely powerful German fleet would deter Britain from intervening if Germany should commit aggression against another European country while on the other hand, a strong German battle fleet could tip the scales in the event of an Anglo-American war, and as such, Britain would ally herself with Germany against the rising power of the United States (like many Germans of his time, Raeder believed there was a strong possibility of an Anglo-American war). Because of the long period in which it took to build a battle fleet, Raeder was, despite his Anglophobia, hostile towards an anti-British foreign policy (at least until the High Seas Fleet was resurrected) and until 1937, Raeder saw his principal enemies as France, Poland and the Soviet Union. Raeder's authoritarian style led him in 1937 to refuse to create the office of chief of the admiralty staff. When Admiral Wilhelm Marschall asked for such a post to be created, Raeder's reply was "But I will direct the war at sea". On 20 April 1936, just a few days before Raeder's 60th birthday, Hitler promoted him to Generaladmiral (General Admiral). In his quest to rebuild the German navy, Raeder faced constant challenges from Hermann Göring's ongoing quest to build up the Luftwaffe.

=== Hossbach Conference and the Blomberg–Fritsch affair ===
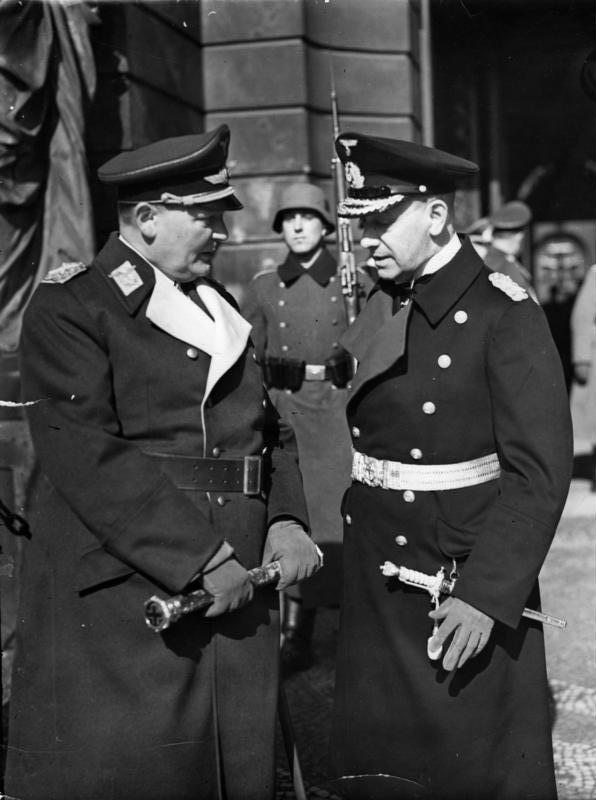
Erich Raeder with Göring

In November 1937, Raeder attended the conference recorded in the Hossbach Memorandum. The meeting had been called following complaints from Raeder that the Navy could not meet its current construction targets as both the Army and Air Force were gobbling up the raw materials needed to build warships. Together with Göring, Raeder were the only ones present who did not object to Hitler's plans for aggression in Eastern Europe. Raeder later claimed when on trial for his life at Nuremberg that the Hossbach conference was a flight of fancy on Hitler's part that nobody took seriously, and he did not object because there was nothing to object to. The American historian Charles Thomas maintains that it was more likely that Raeder's silence during the Hossbach conference was a gambit on his part to increase the Navy's budget by being seen to be supportive of Hitler's foreign policy when the Army leaders were expressing some doubts about the timing. As part of the reorganization of the military command structure following the Blomberg–Fritsch affair in early 1938, it was declared that the service chiefs, namely OKW chief Wilhelm Keitel, Army commander Walter von Brauchitsch, Luftwaffe commander Hermann Göring and Raeder were to have the same status as Cabinet ministers and as such, they all started to receive publicly the same pay as a Cabinet member and privately payments from Konto 5 slush fund. Konto 5 was a slush fund run by the chief of the Reich Chancellery, Hans Lammers, that served to pay bribes to all of the generals, admirals and civil servants to reward them for supporting the Nazi regime. The basis of the corruption system regular monthly tax-free payments deposited in their bank accounts of 4,000 Reichsmark for field marshals and grand admirals and 2,000 Reichsmark for all other senior officers, which came from the Konto 5 slush fund. All this money came as an addition to the official salary of 26,000 Reichsmark a year for field marshals and grand admirals and 24,000 Reichsmark a year for colonel generals and general admirals. In addition, senior officers were given a life-time exemption from paying income tax, which was in effect a huge pay raise given Germany's high income tax rates (by 1939, there was a 65% tax rate for income over 2, 400 R.M) and they were also provided with spending allowances for food, medical care, clothing, and housing.

During the Blomberg–Fritsch affair, the sexually puritanical Raeder was enraged when he learned that the War Minister Werner von Blomberg had married a woman who had posed for pornographic photos, and demanded that Blomberg resign at once for his "disgrace". Not content with Blomberg's resignation, Raeder dispatched an aide, a Captain von Wangenheim, to follow the Blombergs around their honeymoon in Italy; on behalf of Raeder he persistently tried to pressure Blomberg into committing suicide to atone for his marriage. Despite the passionate appeals of Captain von Wangenheim to his honour and his offer to supply a gun to shoot himself, Blomberg declined to end his life for marrying the woman he loved. In the same way, the sexually conservative Raeder who had a very strong dislike of homosexuality was one of the loudest who called for the resignation of the Army commander Werner von Fritsch when he learned that he had been accused of homosexuality, through Raeder qualified this that Fritsch should be reappointed Army commander if the charges were proven to be false. In early 1938, Raeder sat on the Court of Honour that tried and acquitted Fritsch for homosexuality. Though Raeder had promised to join the campaign to reinstate Fritsch as Army Commander if he was acquitted, after Fritsch's trial ended, he reneged on his promise, and instead argued that the Fritsch case was an Army matter that did not concern him, though that had not stopped Raeder from demanding that Fritsch resign when he first learned of the allegations of homosexuality.

=== Z Plan ===
In the late 1930s, when it became clear that Britain was neither going to ally with Germany nor permit Germany a free hand to dominate Europe, Hitler's foreign policy became markedly anti-British. Raeder's traditional Anglophobia, which always led him to view Britain as the main enemy and together the chance for increased naval building represented by the anti-British turn made Raeder into one of the strongest supporters of the anti-British foreign policy. In late 1938, Hitler ordered Raeder to accelerate warship construction. On 4 January 1939 Raeder advised Hitler that given the Kriegsmarine's status as third in regards to allocation of resources and spending behind the Army and the Air Force, the construction targets could not be met within the deadlines given. Raeder reported that in the future the Kriegsmarine would have to take precedence over the other branches of the Wehrmacht to meet the construction targets within Hitler's deadlines. Raeder stated that unless this was done, there would be a delay in warship construction which would ensure that the time when the Kriegsmarine "would be sufficiently strong and ready to act against the big sea powers" would not happen in the near future. Even if the current naval construction programme was completed on time, Raeder warned that the resulting German fleet would still be too weak to win command of the sea, and what was needed was a vast new battlefleet, even larger than Tirpitz's High Seas Fleet to defeat Britain. Finally, Raeder's endless championship of the Seemachtideologie and of the need for the Navy to have primacy in the defence budget bore fruit, and Hitler was won over to the cause of navalism. On 27 January 1939 Hitler approved the Plan Z presented to him by Raeder, and ordered that henceforth the Kriegsmarine would be first in regards to allocation of money and raw materials, marking the first time during Raeder's tenure that the Navy had enjoyed such a position, the first time since 1912 that the Navy had been given the first call on the defence budget.

The Z Plan called for a fleet of 10 battleships, 4 aircraft carriers, 15 Panzerschiffe, 5 heavy cruisers, 44 light cruisers, 68 destroyers and 249 U-boats by 1948. Reflecting Raeder's obsession with big battleships, the Z Plan called for a new class of gigantic H-class battleships to be the core of the proposed fleet, which would have been the largest battleships ever built. With this force, Raeder promised Hitler that he could destroy the Royal Navy. After the Z Plan was completed in the mid-1940s, Raeder's plans called for a "double pole strategy", in which U-boats, Panzerschiffe and cruisers operating alone or in tandem would attack British commerce all over the globe, forcing the Royal Navy to divert ships all over the world to deal with these threats, while at the same time two task forces of carriers, battleships, cruisers and destroyers would engage in frequent sorties into the North Sea, preferably from bases in Norway, to destroy what remained of the British Home Fleet in a series of battles that would give Germany command of the sea. The Canadian naval historian, Commander Kenneth Hansen, wrote that Raeder in devising the idea of a task force of different types of ships was a more forward-looking and innovative officer than he was usually credited with being. In a revisionist picture of Raeder, Hansen charged that the conventional view of Raeder as a blind follower of Mahan and Tirpitz was mistaken, and instead claimed that Raeder was really a follower of the theories promoted by Franz von Hipper of Germany and Raoul Castex of France about using guerre-de-course to force the numerically superior Royal Navy to divert its strength all the world in order to allow a numerically inferior force to engage in battle with the remainder of the British fleet on more or less equal terms. To support the planned global war on the high seas against Britain, Raeder planned to get around the problems posed by the lack of bases outside of Germany by instructing naval architects to increase the range and endurance of German warships and build supply ships to re-supply German raiders on the high seas.

In 1936, Raeder ordered a new class of support ships, the Dithmarschen-class ships, which served as a combined oil tanker-supply ship-hospital ship-repair shop and could carry 9,000 tons of fuel oil and 4,000 tons of lubricating oil plus ammunition, water, spare parts and food. The captains of the Dithmarschen-class ships and Kriegsmarine warships and submarines were trained in Underway replenishment as the practice of transferring goods and fuel from the Dithmarschen ships to the warships and submarines at open sea was known, a most difficult operation that required considerable practice. Through the Dithmarschen ships, Raeder planned to greatly extend the length of time that Kriegsmarine raiders could spend on the high seas before being required to return to Germany. Five Dithmarschen ships were built between 1937 and 1940 and two, the Altmark and the Westerwald, were at sea at the start of the war. Hansen wrote that the Dithmarschen ships were Raeder's most enduring legacy as they provided the basis for the modern support ship; after the war, the United States Navy took over the Dithmarschen and renamed it the USS Conecuh. Despite his strong dislike of Wegener, Raeder agreed that it had been a huge mistake on the part of Germany not to have occupied Norway, the "Gate to the Atlantic", in 1914 as control of Norway would have allowed Germany to escape the North Sea by breaking the British distant blockade. As early as 1915, Wegener had pointed out that the blockade was based upon patrolling the waters between Scotland and Norway, and argued that if Germany had control of Norway, then not only would the blockade be broken, but the German Navy could then force the British Navy to engage in a decisive battle of annihilation. The second part of the "Wegener thesis" about breaking the British distant blockade, namely seizing the Shetland Islands, Wegener's other "Gate to the Atlantic", Raeder rejected as early as the 1920s as utterly impractical.

The German historian Jost Dülffer wrote that Raeder would have been better off in preparing the Z Plan by following the advice of Commander Hellmuth Heye, who had advocated in a 1938 paper a guerre-de-course strategy of Kreuzerkrieg (cruiser war) in which groups of Panzerschiffe and submarines would attack British convoys, or Karl Dönitz, who also advocated a guerre-de-course strategy of using "wolf-packs" of submarines to attack British commerce. Dülffer contended that either option was less expensive, would take less time and was more achievable given German resources than the Z Plan which Raeder chose. The Canadian historian Holger Herwig wrote that the Z Plan was Raeder's fantasy given that the Z Plan fleet would take eight million tons of oil whereas in 1939 Germany imported a total of only six million tons of oil. Naval planners informed Raeder that the Z Plan fleet would require ten million cubic metres of storage to be built in order to supply enough oil to last a year. Raeder never addressed the question of where the oil that was supposed to power the Z Plan fleet was going to come from, or where the oil would be stored once it had been imported.

=== Starting World War II ===
The fleet envisioned in the Z Plan was totally incompatible with the Anglo-German Naval Agreement (A.G.N.A) of 1935, which limited the Kriegsmarine to 35% of the total tonnage of the Royal Navy, which meant that A.G.N.A. would have to be renounced. Raeder's main worry in the first half of 1939 was that the British might grasp "a new opportunity ... to show themselves generous and breathe new life into the treaty". As such, Raeder very much approved of Hitler's denunciation of the A.G.N.A. on 28 April 1939 as opening the way for the implantation of the Z Plan. Raeder later claimed during his testimony at Nuremberg and in his memoirs to have been opposed to the denunciation of the A.G.N.A., which he claimed to have been kept in the dark about, but contemporary evidence from 1939, not the least Raeder's own role as the author of the Z Plan, suggests otherwise.

The only problem Raeder faced was Hitler's determination to attack Poland. Raeder supported the idea of aggression against Poland, but on 31 March 1939 the British Prime Minister Neville Chamberlain had announced the "guarantee" of Poland, by which Britain would go to war against any nation that attempted to end Polish independence. Through Raeder expressed some worry in the first half of 1939 over the prospect of a war with Britain when the Plan Z had barely begun, he accepted and believed in the assurances of Hitler and Foreign Minister Joachim von Ribbentrop that neither Britain nor France would go to war if the Reich attacked Poland. In July 1939, Raeder told Karl Dönitz that his fears of a general war were groundless, and told him he take the entire summer off for a vacation. Despite his belief that the attack on Poland would cause only a local war, on 15 August 1939 Raeder took the precaution of ordering two Panzerschife (the Admiral Graf Spee and the Deutschland), a number of U-boats, and the Dithmarschen-class ships Altmark and German tanker Westerwald (2) to the Atlantic in case Britain should go to war. In late August 1939, Raeder told other senior officers that the danger of a war with Britain and France was extremely remote, and at most Germany had to fear only sanctions if the invasion of Poland went ahead. When Admiral Hermann Boehem sent Raeder a memo in late August saying that the disposition of the German fleet could only made sense if there was no general war, one of Raeder's most senior aides, Captain Kurt Fricke, replied with the comment on the margin: "That is precisely the point! It is highly unlikely".
