= Hugonia micans =

Conservation status
- Vulnerable (IUCN 3.1)

Scientific classification
- Kingdom: Plantae
- Clade: Tracheophytes
- Clade: Angiosperms
- Clade: Eudicots
- Clade: Rosids
- Order: Malpighiales
- Family: Linaceae
- Genus: Hugonia
- Species: H. micans

Binomial name
- Hugonia micans Engl.

Species of flowering plant

Hugonia micans is a species of plant in the Linaceae family. It is found in Cameroon and Gabon. Its natural habitat is subtropical or tropical moist lowland forests. It is threatened by habitat loss.
