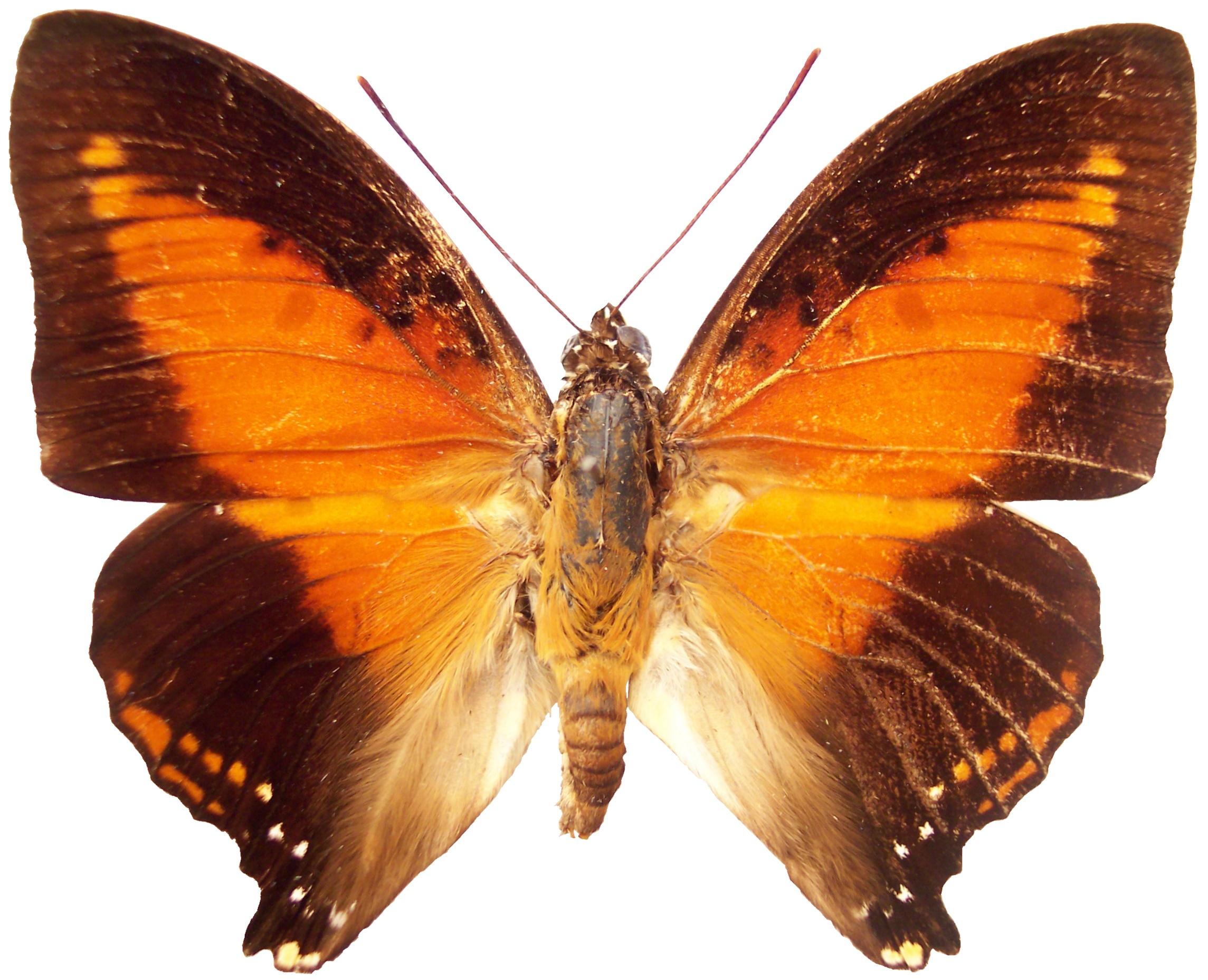
- Male upperside

Scientific classification
- Kingdom: Animalia
- Phylum: Arthropoda
- Clade: Pancrustacea
- Class: Insecta
- Order: Lepidoptera
- Family: Nymphalidae
- Genus: Charaxes
- Species: C. zingha

Binomial name
- Charaxes zingha (Stoll, 1780)

Synonyms
- Papilio zingha Stoll, 1780; Papilio berenice Drury, 1782

= Charaxes zingha =

Shining red charaxes

Species of butterfly

Charaxes zingha, the shining red charaxes, is a butterfly in the family Nymphalidae. It is found in Senegal, Guinea, Sierra Leone, Liberia, Ivory Coast, Ghana, Nigeria, Cameroon, the Republic of the Congo, Angola, the Central African Republic, the northern part of the Democratic Republic of the Congo, Uganda and western Tanzania. The habitat consists of lowland evergreen forests and sometimes gallery forests and coastal scrubland.

The larvae feed on the Hugonia species H. platsepala and H. castaneifolia.

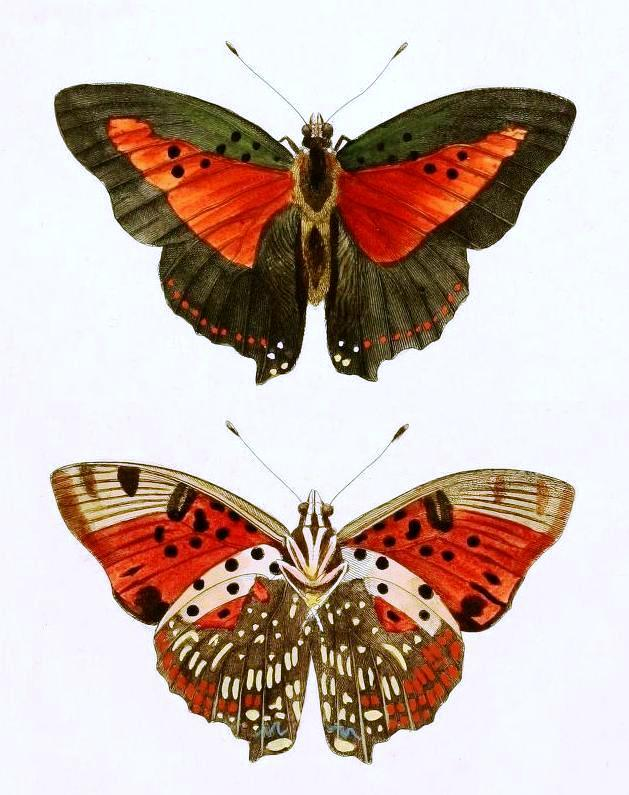
Male upper and underside of wings

== Short description ==
Male: The upperside ground color is black. There is a triangular orange-red patch on the forewing contiguous with the orange-red basal area of the black hindwing, a marginal row of red/yellow spots and four pale spots at the tornus.

The underside of the forewing is grey yellow with a peach-pink area extending from the disc to the dorsum. There are five or six rounded black spots. The very colorful hindwing has a whitish or reddish brown ground color with numerous black markings and stains so that it appears almost netted; the anal lobe is colored yellow on the edge.

Torben Larsen developed a species numbering system for his 2005 publication Butterflies of West Africa. This species is #753. The 'Larsen' numbers have since been used with permission in A Sharp Eye on Butterflies of Ghana.

== Full description ==
Ch. zingha Stoll Both wings above deep black with a common red-yellow or red-brown transverse band; on the forewing this is triangular, extends from the hindmargin to vein 6, reaches the base at the hindmargin and encloses a rounded black spot in the basal part of cellules 2 and 3; on the hindwing it covers the basal area and extends distad to vein 3; the black distal area is ornamented with some red-yellow marginal spots and some white dots at the anal angle. Beneath the forewing is black-grey at the apex and the costal margin, but in the cell and behind vein 3 reddish, with 6 rounded black dots in the cell, a black spot in cellule 3, two in the basal part of cellule 2, a large black submarginal spot in cellule lb and a similar smaller spot in cellule 2. The hindwing beneath is broadly grey-yellow at the costal margin in cellules 7 and 8, with 5 or 6 rounded black spots, then very gaily coloured, the whitish or red-brown ground-colour being divided into spots by a network of numerous black transverse streaks and lines; the anal lobe is yellow at the distal margin. The female is larger and lighter than the male, but otherwise differs but little. Sierra Leone to the Congo. A full description is also given by Walter Rothschild and Karl Jordan, 1900 Novitates Zoologicae volume 7:287-524. page 452 for terms see volume 5:545-601

== Taxonomy ==
Charaxes zingha is the sole member of the Charaxes zingha species group (subgenus Zingha)

== Realm ==
Afrotropical realm.
