= Hugonia planchonii =

Scientific classification
- Kingdom: Plantae
- Clade: Tracheophytes
- Clade: Angiosperms
- Clade: Eudicots
- Clade: Rosids
- Order: Malpighiales
- Family: Linaceae
- Genus: Hugonia
- Species: H. planchonii

Binomial name
- Hugonia planchonii Hook.f.

Species of flowering plant

Hugonia planchonii is a liana with bright yellow flowers that are short-lived and stems producing alternate hooks that is endemic to countries in Tropical West Africa but also occurs in Cameroon and Gabon. It is within the Linaceae family.

In traditional medicine, leaves are obtained to make a regimen to treat bronchitis or cough

== Description ==
The species is a liana with brown stem that is hairy when young but glabrescent or with short hairs when matured, the stems have recurved hooks. Leaves are stalked and shiny; stipules are pubescent and 5–10 mm long, petiole is 3–6 mm long; leaf-blade lanceolate to obovate, the species has inconspicuous domatia or sometimes are without the one, the leaf-blade is 5–16 cm long and 2–5 cm wide, surface is slightly coriaceous while the upper surface is glabrous, around the midrib to lower surface, it is glabrescent to pubescent. Flowers are yellow and in axillary cymes; sepals are semi-erect, reddish and densely pubescent.
