= Jean-Antoine Roucher =

French poet (1745–1794)

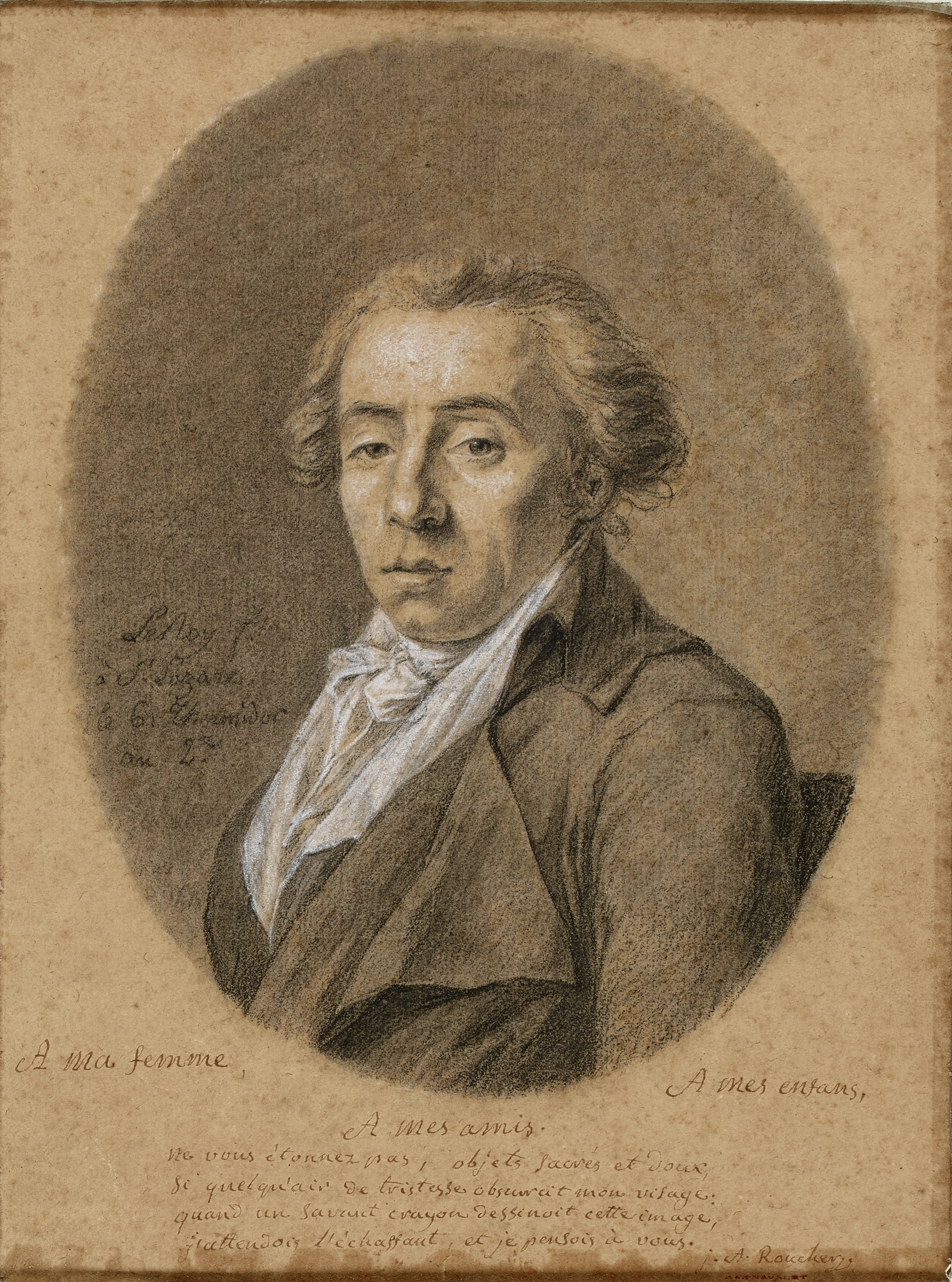
Last portrait of Jean-Antoine Roucher, drawn in prison 24 July 1794 by Joseph-François Le Roy (Paris, musée Carnavalet)

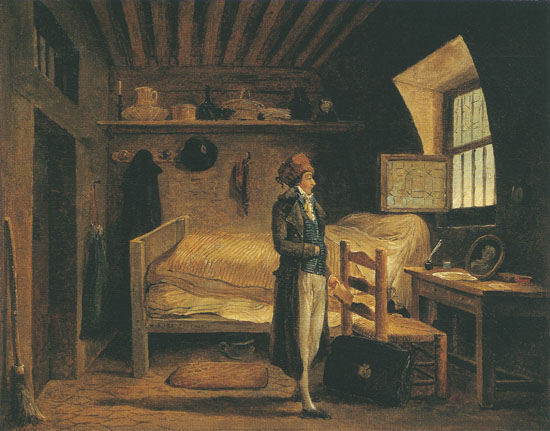
Jean-Antoine Roucher gets ready for the transit for Sainte-Pélagie Prison to Saint-Lazare, by Hubert Robert.

Jean-Antoine Roucher (February 22, 1745 - July 25, 1794), was a French poet.

Roucher was born in Montpellier, the son of a tailor. His epithalamium on Louis XVI and Marie Antoinette won him the favour of Turgot, and a salt-tax collectorship. His poem, entitled Les Mois, appeared in 1779, was praised in manuscript, but critically lambasted until the 19th century. The malicious wit of Antoine de Rivarol's mot on the critical failure of the poem, "Cest le plus beau naufrage du siècle," reflects the fact that one of the most elaborate passages describes a shipwreck.

Roucher was a disciple of Voltaire, and a friend of the French Revolution, but he remained moderate in his opinions. He presided over an anti-Jacobin club, and denounced the tyranny of the popular demagogues in supplements published with the Journal de Paris in 1792. He was arrested on October 4, 1793, and, accused of being the leader of a conspiracy among the prisoners at Saint-Lazare. He was sent to the guillotine on the same tumbril as his friend André Chénier, on July 25, 1794.

In 1790, Roucher had translated Adam Smith's Wealth of Nations. His letters from prison were edited by his son-in-law under the title of Consolations de ma captivité (1797), and his death was made the subject of an 1834 tragedy by his playwright brother Claude Roucher-Deratte, a prolific writer.

== Honours ==
In 1847, the botanist Jules Émile Planchon named a genus of flowering plants from Nicaragua to southern Tropical America, in the family Linaceae, Roucheria in his honour. Then in 1921, the botanist Johannes Gottfried Hallier named a genus of flowering plants from Cambodia, Vietnam and Borneo, (also in the family Linaceae) Indorouchera in his honour, with the 'Indo' prefix.
