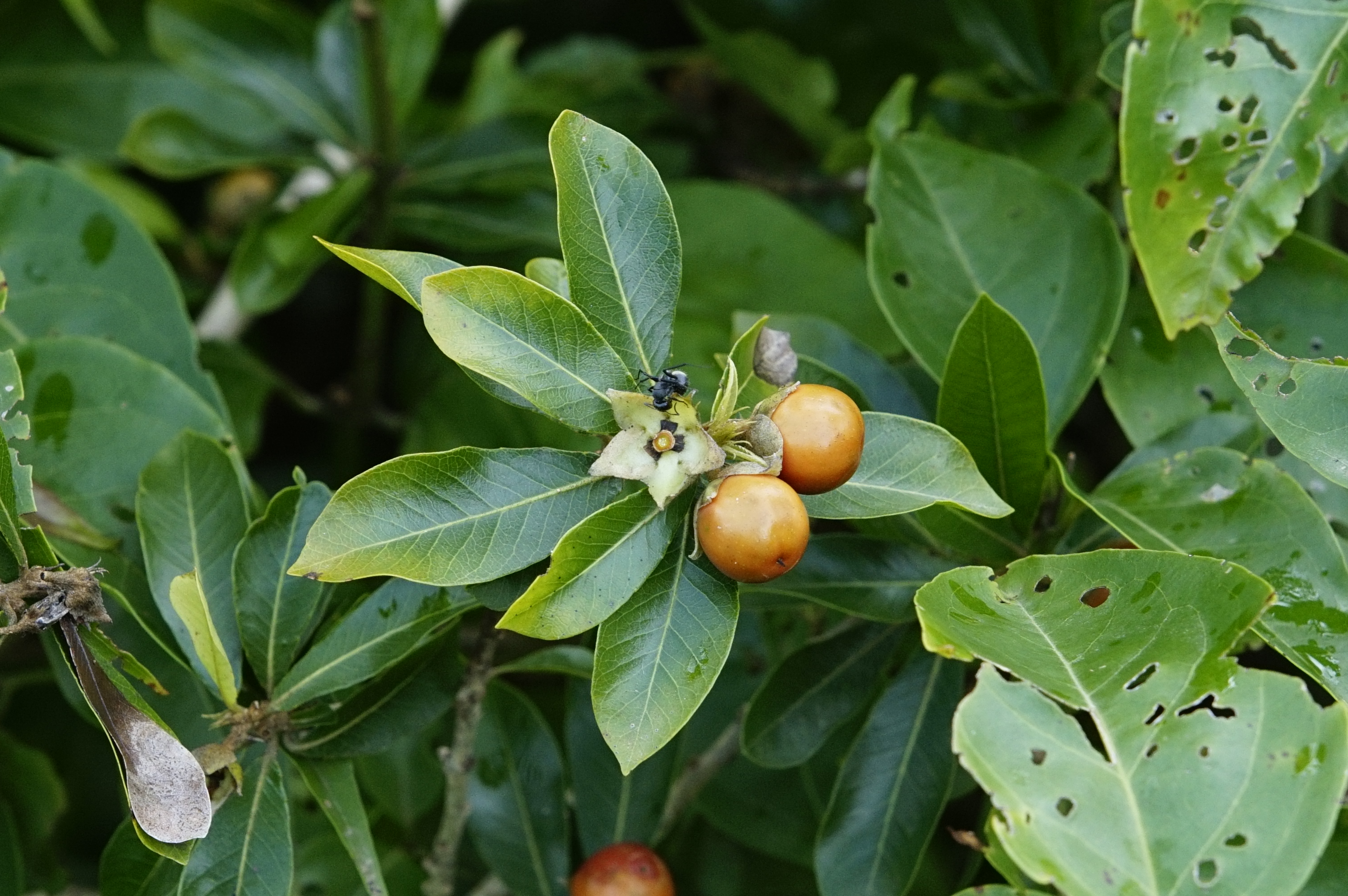

Scientific classification
- Kingdom: Plantae
- Clade: Tracheophytes
- Clade: Angiosperms
- Clade: Eudicots
- Clade: Rosids
- Order: Malpighiales
- Family: Linaceae
- Genus: Hugonia
- Species: H. mystax

Binomial name
- Hugonia mystax L.

= Hugonia mystax =

Species of flowering plant

Hugonia mystax is a species of plant in the family Linaceae found mainly in the dry forests of peninsular India and Sri Lanka. It is a scandent shrub, sometimes growing liana-like over other trees and bears yellow flowers and orange to red fruits in the rainy season. The branchlets are leafless at the base and instead have a pair of recurved spines which bear a resemblance to a moustache, giving rise to the epithet mystax, Latin for moustache.

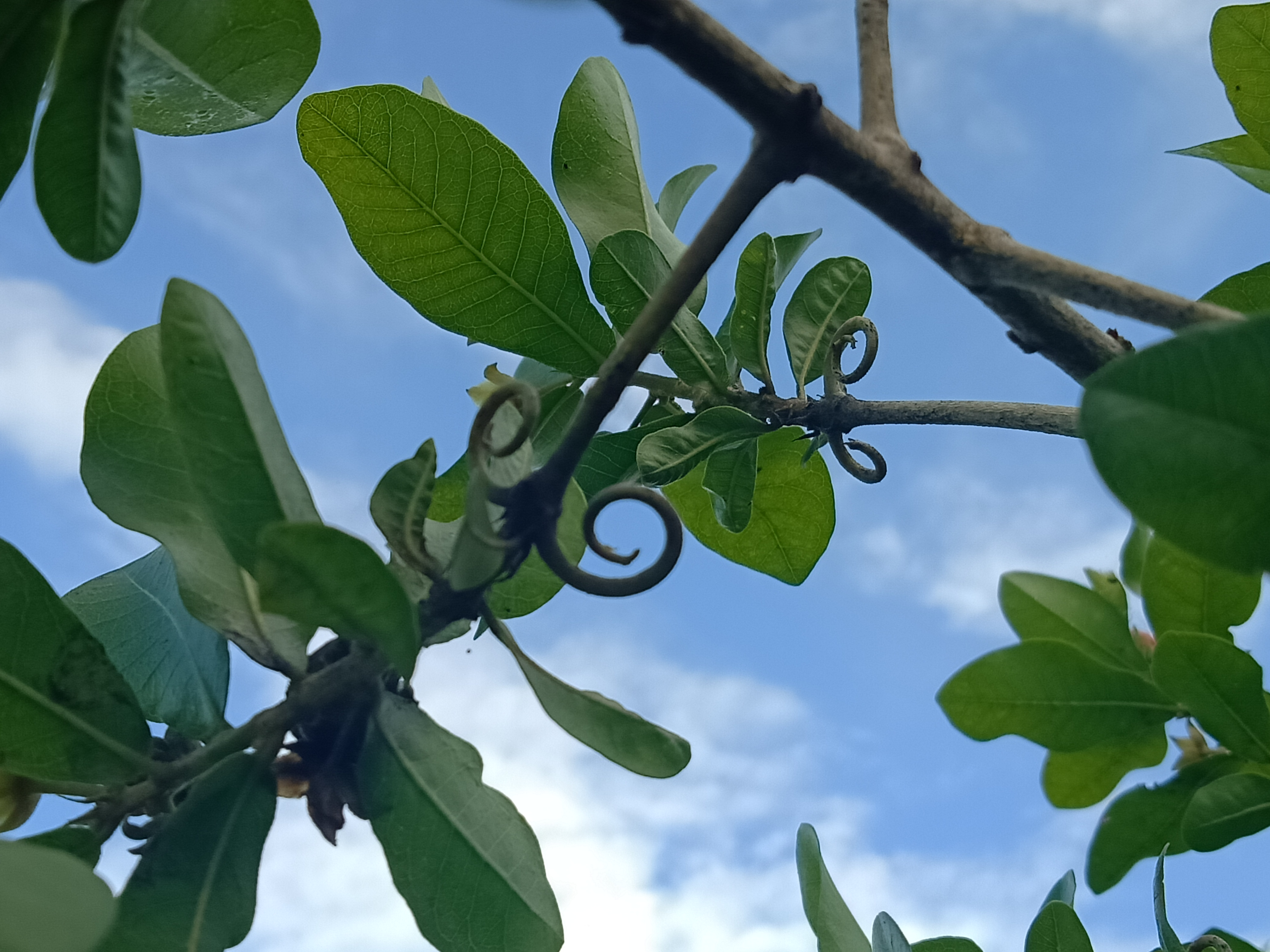
Recurved spines that give the species name

The Tamil name, mothira-kanni, refers to the resemblance to a ring. The roots of the plant are astringent and bittersweet, and are used to treat fevers, verminosis, and inflammations.

The species is common in the dry scrub and tropical dry evergreen forests of peninsular India south from Maharashtra to Orissa. It flowers according to the rains, twice a year in some parts of the peninsula. The flowers are pollinated by Apis bees. The fruits are eaten by birds and seeds may be dispersed by them. The leaves are used in traditional medicine and used as an anti-inflammatory.
