= Hugonia macrophylla =

Conservation status
- Vulnerable (IUCN 3.1)

Scientific classification
- Kingdom: Plantae
- Clade: Tracheophytes
- Clade: Angiosperms
- Clade: Eudicots
- Clade: Rosids
- Order: Malpighiales
- Family: Linaceae
- Genus: Hugonia
- Species: H. macrophylla

Binomial name
- Hugonia macrophylla Oliv.

Species of flowering plant

Hugonia macrophylla is a species of plant in the Linaceae family. It is endemic to Cameroon. Its natural habitat is subtropical or tropical moist lowland forests. It is threatened by habitat loss.
