= Hebepetalum =

Scientific classification
- Kingdom: Plantae
- Clade: Tracheophytes
- Clade: Angiosperms
- Clade: Eudicots
- Clade: Rosids
- Order: Malpighiales
- Family: Linaceae
- Subfamily: Hugonioideae
- Genus: Hebepetalum; Benth.

Genus of plants

Hebepetalum is a genus of flowering plants belonging to the family Linaceae.

Its native range is Southern Tropical America.

Species:

- Hebepetalum humiriifolium (Planch.) Benth. & Hook.f. ex B.D.Jacks.
- Hebepetalum neblinae Jardim & P.E.Berry
- Hebepetalum roraimense Secco & Manni Silva
