= Sclerolinon =

Scientific classification
- Kingdom: Plantae
- Clade: Tracheophytes
- Clade: Angiosperms
- Clade: Eudicots
- Clade: Rosids
- Order: Malpighiales
- Family: Linaceae
- Subfamily: Linoideae
- Genus: Sclerolinon; C.M.Rogers
- Species: S. digynum

Binomial name
- Sclerolinon digynum (A.Gray) C.M.Rogers

Synonyms
- Linum digynum A.Gray; Cathartolinum digynum A.Gray

Genus of flowering plants

Sclerolinon is a monotypic genus of flowering plants in the flax family (Linaceae) containing the single species Sclerolinon digynum, which is known by the common names northwestern yellowflax (Note: "USDA Plants Database". plants.usda.gov. Archived from the original on 15 June 2024. (Note: The archived version of this webpage may not display properly in some browsers. If the page shows a blue background but does not show any content, try opening it in Google Chrome.)) and yellow hard flax. It is native to the western United States, where it has been recorded in Washington, Idaho, Oregon, and as far south as central California. It grows in seasonally wet habitats, such as mountain meadows and vernal pools.

It is an annual herb producing a hairless, erect stem up to 20 cm (7.9 inches) tall. The leaves are oval in shape, and the upper leaves have serrated edges. They are oppositely arranged about the stem and grow erect instead of spreading away from the stem. The inflorescence is a cyme of flowers surrounded by serrated, leaflike bracts. The flower has five yellow petals in a calyx of toothed sepals.

S. digynum is the only member of the Linaceae family which has both yellow flowers and serrated leaves.

== Classification ==
S. digynum was formerly included in the genus Linum, along with many other flax plants, and many older sources refer to it as Linum digynum. However, some authors placed it in now-obsolete genus Cathartolinum, and multiple authors noted its similarity to species in Hesperolinon, which itself began as a section within Linum and was later reclassified and became a genus.

In 1961, Helen Sharsmith wrote a morphological description of Hesperolinon species and included digynum in the list, in agreement with some assessments from the late 1800s. C.M. Rogers subsequently reclassified the species in 1966, moving S. digynum into its own genus due to its morphological distinctness.

== Distribution ==
S. digynum has historically been found in the U.S. states of Idaho, Washington, Oregon, and California.

In Idaho it is considered rare, and possibly extirpated. The most recent reports of S. digynum in Idaho are from the 1800s, when it was seen in Kootenai and Nez Perce counties.

In Washington, S. digynum is considered sensitive or threatened. It occurs in the Columbia Plateau ecoregion east of the Cascade Range, and has specifically been found in Spokane and Whitman counties. Here it blooms from May or June through late July.

In Oregon, it has been recorded in Marion, Linn, Benton, Klamath, Jackson, and Josephine counties.

In California, it has been recorded in Glenn, Siskiyou, Shasta, Plumas, Butte, Sierra, Amador, Calaveras, Tuolomne, Mariposa, Madera, and Fresno counties. It blooms from June through August.
