= Indorouchera =

Scientific classification
- Kingdom: Plantae
- Clade: Tracheophytes
- Clade: Angiosperms
- Clade: Eudicots
- Clade: Rosids
- Order: Malpighiales
- Family: Linaceae
- Subfamily: Hugonioideae
- Genus: Indorouchera; Hallier f.
- Species: I. contestiana

Binomial name
- Indorouchera contestiana (Pierre) Hallier f.

Synonyms
- Indorouchera rhamnifolia Hallier f.; Roucheria contestiana Pierre

Genus of plants

Indorouchera is a monotypic genus of flowering plants belonging to the family Linaceae. It only contains one species, Indorouchera contestiana.

Its native range is Cambodia to Vietnam and Borneo.

== Description ==
A liana that can grow up to 10 m (33 ft) long, or sometimes a shrub that can grow up to 4 m (13 ft) tall. It has leaves that are elliptic to ovate in shape and they are 3–11.5 cm (1–5 in) long and 1.5–4.7 cm (1–2 in) wide. The stipules are liguliform (strap-shaped) to shallowly triangular in shape. They are entire to crenate and 0.8–1.5 mm (0–0 in) long and 1–1.5 mm (0–0 in) wide. The flowers are in 4-7 flowered fascicles (small or slender bundles). The sepals are elliptic to ovate in shape. They are 1.7–2.5 mm (0–0 in) long and 0.7–1.6 mm (0–0 in) wide. The stamens are 1.8-2.2 mm long and 2.5-3.5 mm wide. The ovary is 3-loculed (has 3 chambers), rather smooth, cylindric to ovoid in shape and 0.8-1 mm long and 0.6-0.7 mm wide. It has 1 or 2 seeds which are ventrally attached (fixed to the belly or underneath). They are often asymmetric, semi-ovoid in shape and 2.5—2.1 mm long and 1.7-1.9 wide.

== Taxonomy ==
The genus name of Indorouchera is in honour of Jean-Antoine Roucher (1745–1794), a French poet, the reason for the Latin specific epithet of contestiana has not been published. Both genus and species were published in Beih. Bot. Centralbl. Vol.39 (Issue 2) on pages 49-50 in 1921.

== Uses ==
The plant contains saponin-like constituents which are toxic. They are used to create poisons to place on arrow tips. The wood (of the stems) is tough, but not excessively hard, and will not split easily.
