= Anisadenia =

Scientific classification
- Kingdom: Plantae
- Clade: Tracheophytes
- Clade: Angiosperms
- Clade: Eudicots
- Clade: Rosids
- Order: Malpighiales
- Family: Linaceae
- Subfamily: Linoideae
- Genus: Anisadenia; Wall. ex Meisn.

Genus of flowering plants

Anisadenia is a genus of flowering plants belonging to the family Linaceae.

Its native range is Himalaya to Central China.

Species:

- Anisadenia pubescens Griff.
- Anisadenia saxatilis Wall. ex Meisn.
