= Roucheria =

Scientific classification
- Kingdom: Plantae
- Clade: Tracheophytes
- Clade: Angiosperms
- Clade: Eudicots
- Clade: Rosids
- Order: Malpighiales
- Family: Linaceae
- Subfamily: Hugonioideae
- Genus: Roucheria; Planch.

Genus of flowering plant

Roucheria is a genus of flowering plants belonging to the family Linaceae.

Its native range is Nicaragua to southern Tropical America. It is found in Bolivia, Brazil (northern, north-eastern and west-central), Colombia, Ecuador, French Guiana, Guyana, Nicaragua, Peru, Suriname and Venezuela.

The genus name of Roucheria is in honour of Jean-Antoine Roucher (1745–1794), a French poet. It was first described and published in London J. Bot. Vol.6 on page 141 in 1847.

== Known species ==
According to Kew:

- Roucheria calophylla Planch.
- Roucheria columbiana Hallier f.
- Roucheria elata Ducke
- Roucheria laxiflora H.J.P.Winkl.
- Roucheria monsalveae A.H.Gentry
- Roucheria schomburgkii Planch.
- Roucheria sipapoensis Jardim & P.E.Berry
