= Alfred von Tirpitz =

German naval officer (1849–1930)

- Von Tirpitz in 1903
- Born: 19 March 1849; Küstrin, Prussia
- Died: 6 March 1930 (aged 80); Ebenhausen, Germany
- Burial place: Munich Waldfriedhof
- Military career
- Allegiance: Kingdom of Prussia (1869–1871); German Empire (1871–1916)
- Branch: Prussian Navy
- Service years: 1869–1916
- Rank: Grand admiral
- Commands: Torpedo Inspectorate; SMS Preussen; SMS Württemberg; East Asia Squadron; Imperial Naval Office
- Conflicts: Franco-Prussian War; World War I
- Awards: Pour le Mérite; Knight of the Order of the Black Eagle; Friedrich Order; Knight Grand Cross of the Royal Victorian Order
- Alfred von Tirpitz's voice Recorded 1915

State Secretary for the Navy of Germany
- In office 18 June 1897 – 15 March 1916
- Monarch: Wilhelm II
- Chancellor: Chlodwig Carl Viktor; Bernhard von Bülow; Theobald von Bethmann Hollweg
- Preceded by: Friedrich von Hollmann
- Succeeded by: Eduard von Capelle

Alfred Peter Friedrich von Tirpitz (German pronunciation: [ˈalfʁeːt fɔn ˈtɪʁpɪt͡s]; born Alfred Peter Friedrich Tirpitz; 19 March 1849 – 6 March 1930) was a German grand admiral and State Secretary of the German Imperial Naval Office, the administrative branch of the German Imperial Navy from 1897 until 1916.

Prussia never had a major navy, nor did any of the other German states before the German Empire was formed in 1871. Tirpitz took the modest Imperial Navy and, beginning in the 1890s, turned it into a world-class force that could threaten Britain's Royal Navy. However, during World War I, his High Seas Fleet proved unable to end Britain's command of the sea and its chokehold on Germany's economy. The one great engagement at sea, the Battle of Jutland, ended in a narrow German tactical victory but a strategic failure.

As the High Seas Fleet's limitations became increasingly apparent during the war, Tirpitz became an outspoken advocate for unrestricted submarine warfare, a policy which would ultimately bring Germany into conflict with the United States. By the beginning of 1916, he was dismissed from office and never regained power. Following his dismissal, he became Chairman of the far-right German Fatherland Party, an ideological precursor to the German National People's Party.

== Family and early life ==
Tirpitz was born in Küstrin (today Kostrzyn in Poland) in the Prussian province of Brandenburg, the son of lawyer and later judge Rudolf Tirpitz (1811–1905). His mother was the daughter of a doctor. Tirpitz grew up in Frankfurt (Oder). He recorded in his memoirs that as a child he was a mediocre pupil.

Tirpitz spoke English fluently and was sufficiently at home in Britain that he sent his two daughters Ilse and Margot to Cheltenham Ladies' College.

On 18 November 1884 he married Maria Augusta Lipke (born 11 October 1860 in Schwetz, West Prussia, died after 1941). On 12 June 1900 he was elevated to the Prussian nobility, becoming von Tirpitz. He had four children: Max, Wolfgang, Ilse (born 1885) and Margot (born 1888). His son, Oberleutnant zur See Wolfgang von Tirpitz, was taken prisoner of war after the sinking of SMS Mainz in the Battle of Heligoland Bight on 28 August 1914. Ilse married diplomat Ulrich von Hassell who was executed in 1944 as an anti-Hitler activist. Their daughter Fey von Hassell and her young sons were then taken as hostages. She wrote of the experience in A Mother's War.

== Naval career ==
Tirpitz joined the Prussian Navy more by accident than design when a friend announced that he was doing so. Tirpitz decided he liked the idea and with the consent of his parents became a naval cadet at the age of 16, on 24 April 1865. He attended Kiel Naval School. Within a year Prussia was at war with Austria. Tirpitz became a midshipman (Seekadett) on 24 June 1866 and was posted to a sailing ship patrolling the English Channel. In 1866 Prussia became part of the North German Confederation, the navy officially became that of the confederation and Tirpitz joined the new institution on 24 June 1869.

On 22 September 1869 he had obtained the rank of Unterleutnant zur See (sub-lieutenant) and served on board the ironclad SMS König Wilhelm. During the Franco-Prussian War the Prussian Navy was greatly outnumbered and so the ship spent the duration of the war at anchor, much to the embarrassment of the navy. During the early years of Tirpitz's career, Prussia and Great Britain were on good terms and the Prussian Navy spent much time in British ports. Tirpitz reported that Plymouth was more hospitable to German sailors than was Kiel, while it was also easier to obtain equipment and supplies there, which were of better quality than available at home. At this time the British Royal Navy was pleased to assist that of Prussia in its development and Prussian officers had considerable respect for their British counterparts.

=== Development of torpedoes ===
Unification of Germany in 1871 again meant a change of name, to the German Imperial Navy. On 25 May 1872 Tirpitz was promoted to Leutnant zur See (lieutenant at sea) and on 18 November 1875 to Kapitänleutnant (captain-lieutenant). In 1877 he was chosen to visit the Whitehead Torpedo Works at Fiume and afterwards was placed in charge of the German torpedo section, later renamed the Torpedo Inspectorate. By 1879 a working device had been produced, but even under demonstration conditions Tirpitz reckoned it was as likely to miss a target as to hit it. On 17 September 1881 he became Korvettenkapitän (corvette captain). From developing torpedoes, Tirpitz moved on to developing torpedo boats to deliver them. The State Secretary for the Navy, Leo von Caprivi, was a distant relation, and Tirpitz now worked with him on the development of tactics. Caprivi envisioned that the boats would be used defensively against their most likely enemy, France, but Tirpitz set about developing plans to attack the French home port of Cherbourg-en-Cotentin. Tirpitz later described his time with torpedo boats as "the eleven best years of my life".

=== Strategic development of the navy ===
In 1887 the torpedo boats escorted Prince Wilhelm to attend the Golden Jubilee celebrations of his grandmother, Queen Victoria. This was the first time Tirpitz met Wilhelm. In July 1888 Caprivi was succeeded by Alexander von Monts. Torpedo boats were no longer considered important, and Tirpitz requested transfer, commanding the ironclads SMS Preussen and then SMS Württemberg. He was promoted to captain (Kapitän zur See) 24 November 1888 and in 1890 became chief of staff of the Baltic Squadron. On one occasion the Kaiser was attending dinner with the senior naval officers at Kiel and asked their opinion on how the navy should develop. Finally the question came to Tirpitz and he advised building battleships. This was an answer which appealed to the Kaiser, and nine months later he was transferred to Berlin to work on a new strategy for creating a high seas fleet. Tirpitz appointed a staff of officers he had known from his time with the torpedo boats and collected together all sorts of vessels as stand-in battleships to conduct exercises to test out tactics. On 1 December 1892 he made a presentation of his findings to the Kaiser. This brought him into conflict with the Navy State Secretary, Admiral Friedrich von Hollmann. Hollmann was responsible for procurement of ships, and had a policy of collecting ships as funding permitted. Tirpitz had concluded that the best fighting arrangement was a squadron of eight identical battleships, rather than any other combination of ships with mixed abilities. Further ships should then be added in groups of eight. Hollmann favoured a mixed fleet including cruisers for long-distance operations overseas. Tirpitz believed that in a war no number of cruisers would be safe unless backed up by sufficient battleships.

Kapitän zur See (captain at sea) Tirpitz became chief of the naval staff in 1892 and was made a Konteradmiral (rear admiral) in 1895.

In autumn 1895, frustrated by the non-adoption of his recommendations, Tirpitz asked to be replaced. The Kaiser, not wishing to lose him, asked instead that he prepare a set of recommendations for ship construction. This was delivered on 3 January 1896, but the timing was bad as it coincided with raids into the Transvaal in Southern Africa by pro-British forces against the pro-German Boers. The Kaiser immediately set his mind to demanding cruisers which could operate at a distance and influence the war. Hollman was tasked with obtaining money from the Reichstag for a building programme, but failed to gain funding for enough ships to satisfy anyone. Imperial Chancellor Hohenlohe saw no sense in naval enlargement and reported back that the Reichstag opposed it. Admiral Gustav von Senden-Bibran, Chief of the Naval Cabinet, advised that the only possibility lay in replacing Hollmann: Wilhelm impulsively decided to appoint Tirpitz.

Meanwhile, however, Hollmann had obtained funding for one battleship and three large cruisers. It was felt that replacing him before the bill had completed approval through the Reichstag would be a mistake. Instead, Tirpitz was placed in charge of the German East Asia Squadron in the Far East but with a promise of appointment as secretary at a suitable moment. The cruiser squadron operated from British facilities in Hong Kong which were far from satisfactory as the German ships always took second place for available docks. Tirpitz was instructed to find a suitable site for a new port, selecting four possible sites. Although he initially favoured the bay at Kiautschou/Tsingtao, others in the naval establishment advocated a different location and even Tirpitz wavered on his commitment in his final report. A "lease" on the land was acquired in 1898 after it was fortuitously occupied by German forces. On 12 March 1896 the Reichstag cut back Hollmann's appropriation of 70 million marks to 58 million, and Hollman offered his resignation. Tirpitz was summoned home and offered the post of secretary of the Imperial Navy office (Reichsmarineamt). He went home the long way, touring the United States on the way and arriving in Berlin 6 June 1897. He was pessimistic of his chances of succeeding with the Reichstag.

=== State Secretary of the Imperial Navy Office ===
On 15 June Tirpitz presented a memorandum on the makeup and purpose of the German fleet to the Kaiser. This defined the principal enemy as Great Britain, and the principal area of conflict to be that between Heligoland and the Thames. Cruiser warfare around the globe was deemed impractical because Germany had few bases to resupply ships, while the chief need was for as many battleships as possible to take on the British fleet. A target was outlined for two squadrons of eight battleships, plus a fleet flagship and two reserves. This was to be completed by 1905 and cost 408 million marks, or 58 million per year, the same as the existing budget. The proposal was innovative in several ways. It made a clear statement of naval needs, whereas before the navy had grown piecemeal. It set out the programme for seven years ahead, which neither the Reichstag nor the navy should change. It defined a change in German foreign policy so as to justify the existence of the fleet: Great Britain up to this point had been friendly, now it was officially an enemy. The Kaiser agreed to the plan and Tirpitz retired to St Blasien in the Black Forest with a team of naval specialists to draft a naval bill for presentation to the Reichstag. Information about the plan leaked out to Admiral Knorr, head of the Naval High Command. Tirpitz agreed to a joint committee to discuss changes in the navy, but then arranged that it never receive any information. Similarly, he arranged a joint committee with the Treasury State Secretary to discuss finance, which never discussed anything. Meanwhile, he continued his best efforts to convince the Kaiser and Chancellor, so that in due course he could announce the issues had already been decided at a higher level and thereby avoid debate.

Once the bill was nearly complete Tirpitz started a round of visits to obtain support. First he visited the former chancellor and elder statesman, Prince Bismarck. Armed with the announcement that the Kaiser intended to name the next ship launched Furst Bismarck, he persuaded the former chancellor, who had been dismissed from office for disagreement with Wilhelm II, to modestly support the proposals. Tirpitz now visited the King of Saxony, the Prince Regent of Bavaria, the Grand Duke of Baden and Oldenburg and the councils of the Hanseatic towns. On 19 October the draft bill was sent to the printers for presentation to the Reichstag. Tirpitz's approach was to be as accommodating with the deputies as he could. He was patient and good humoured, proceeding on the assumption that if everything was explained carefully, then the deputies would naturally be convinced. Groups were invited to private meetings to discuss the bill. Tours of ships and shipyards were arranged. The Kaiser and Chancellor stressed that the fleet was only intended for protection of Germany, but so that even a first class power might think twice before attacking. Highlights from a letter Prince Bismarck wrote were read out in the Reichstag, though not mentioning passages where he expressed reservations. Papers were circulated showing the relative size of foreign fleets, and how much Germany had fallen behind, particularly when considering the great power of her army compared to others.

A press bureau was created in the Navy Ministry to ensure journalists were thoroughly briefed, and to politely answer any and all objections. Pre-written articles were provided for the convenience of journalists. University professors were invited to speak on the importance of protecting German trade. The Navy League was formed to popularise the idea of world naval power and its importance to the Empire. It was argued that colonies overseas were essential, and Germany deserved her "place in the sun". League membership grew from 78,000 in 1898, to 600,000 in 1901 and 1.1 million by 1914. Special attention was given to members of the budget committee who would consider the bill in detail. Their interests and connections were analysed to find ways to influence them. Steel magnate Fritz Krupp and shipowner Albert Ballin of the Hamburg-America Line were invited to speak on the benefits of the bill to trade and industry.

Objections were raised that the bill surrendered one of the most important powers of the Reichstag, that of annually scrutinising expenditure. Conservatives felt that expenditure on the navy was wasted, and that if money was available it should go to the army, which would be the deciding factor in any likely war. Eugen Richter of the Liberal Radical Union opposing the bill observed that if it was intended for Germany now to seriously take up the trident to match its other forces, then such a small force would not suffice, and there would be no end to ship building. August Bebel of the Social Democrats argued that there existed a number of deputies who were Anglophobes and wished to pick a fight with Britain, but that to imagine such a fleet could take on the Royal Navy was insanity and anyone saying it belonged in the madhouse.

Yet by the end of the debates the country was convinced that the bill would and should be passed. On 26 March 1898 it did so, by a majority of 212 to 139. All those around the Kaiser were ecstatic at their success. Tirpitz as navy minister was elevated to a seat on the Prussian Ministry of State. His influence and importance as the man who had accomplished this miracle was assured and he was to remain at the centre of government for the next nineteen years.

==== Second Naval Bill ====
One year after the passage of the bill Tirpitz appeared before the Reichstag and declared his satisfaction with it. The specified fleet would still be smaller than the French or British, but would be able to deter the Russians in the Baltic. Within another year all had changed. In October 1899 the Boer War broke out between the British and Boers in South Africa. In January 1900 a British cruiser intercepted three German mail steamers and searched them for war supplies intended for the Boers. Germany was outraged and the opportunity presented itself for a second Naval Bill. The second bill doubled the number of battleships from nineteen to thirty-eight. This would form four squadrons of eight ships, plus two flagships and four reserves. The bill now spanned seventeen years from 1901 to 1917 with the final ships being completed by 1920. This would constitute the second-largest fleet in the world and although no mention was made in the bill of specific enemies, it made several general mentions of a greater power which it was intended to oppose. There was only one navy which could be meant. On 5 December 1899 Tirpitz was promoted to Vizeadmiral (vice admiral). The bill passed on 20 June 1900.

Specifically written into the preamble was an explanation of Tirpitz's risk theory. Although the German fleet would be smaller, it was likely that an enemy with a world spanning empire would not be able to concentrate all its forces in local waters. Even if it could, the German fleet would still be sufficiently powerful to inflict significant damage in any battle, sufficient damage that the enemy would be unable to maintain its other naval commitments and must suffer irreparable harm. Thus no such enemy would risk an engagement. Privately, Tirpitz acknowledged a second risk: that Britain might see the growing German fleet and attack before it grew to a dangerous size. A similar course had been taken before when Lord Nelson sank Danish ships at Copenhagen to prevent them falling into French hands. Tirpitz calculated this danger period would end in 1904 or 1905. In the event, Britain responded to the increased German building programme by building more ships herself and the theoretical danger period extended itself to beyond the start of the Great War. As a reward for the successful bill Tirpitz was ennobled with the hereditary article von before his name in 1900.

Tirpitz noted the difficulties in his relationship with the Kaiser. Wilhelm respected him as the only man who had succeeded in persuading the Reichstag to start and then increase a world class navy, but he remained unpredictable. He was fanatical about the navy, but would come up with wild ideas for improvements, which Tirpitz had to deflect to maintain his objectives. Each summer Tirpitz would go to St Blasien with his aides to work on naval plans, then in September he would travel to the Kaiser's retreat at Rominten, where Tirpitz found he would be more relaxed and willing to listen to a well argued explanation.

Three supplementary naval bills (Novelles) were passed, in June 1906, April 1908 and June 1912. The first followed German diplomatic defeats over Morocco, and added six large cruisers to the fleet. The second followed fears of British encroachment, and reduced the replacement time which a ship would remain in service from 25 to 20 years. The third was caused by the Agadir Crisis where again Germany had to draw back. This time three more battleships were added.

The first naval law caused little alarm in the United Kingdom. There was already in force a dual power standard defining the size of the British fleet as at least that of the next two largest fleets combined. There was now a new player, but her fleet was similar in size to the other two possible threats, Russia and France, and a number of battleships were already under construction. The second naval law, however, caused serious alarm: eight King Edward VII-class battleships were ordered in response. It was the regularity and efficiency with which Germany was now building ships, which were seen to be as good as any in the world, which raised concern. Information about the design of the new battleships suggested they were only intended to operate within a short range of a home base and not to stay at sea for extended periods. They seemed designed only for operations in the North Sea. The result was that Britain abandoned its policy of isolation which had held force since the time of Nelson and began to look for allies against the growing threat from Germany. Ships were withdrawn from around the world and brought back to British waters, while construction of new ships increased.

==== Tirpitz Plan ====
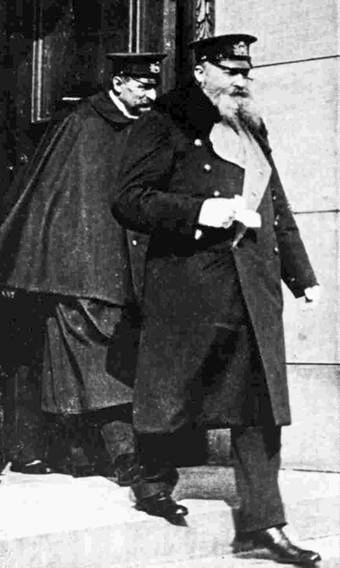
Grand Admiral von Tirpitz in 1915

Tirpitz's design to achieve world power status through naval power, while at the same time addressing domestic issues, is referred to as the Tirpitz Plan. Politically, the Tirpitz Plan was marked by the Fleet Acts of 1898, 1900, 1908 and 1912. By 1914, they had given Germany the second-largest naval force in the world (roughly 40% smaller than the Royal Navy). It included seventeen modern dreadnoughts, five battlecruisers, twenty-five cruisers and twenty pre-dreadnought battleships as well as over forty submarines. Although including fairly unrealistic targets, the expansion programme was sufficient to alarm the British, starting a costly naval arms race and pushing the British into closer ties with the French.

Tirpitz believed that the development of maritime power would advance Germany's economic interests and so serve as a "palliative against educated and uneducated Social Democrats".

Tirpitz developed a "risk theory" whereby, if the German Imperial Navy reached a certain level of strength relative to Britain's Royal Navy, the British would try to avoid confrontation with Germany (that is, maintain a fleet in being). If the two navies fought, the German Navy would inflict enough damage on the British that the latter ran a risk of losing their naval dominance. Because the British relied on their navy to maintain control over the British Empire, Tirpitz felt they would opt to maintain naval supremacy in order to safeguard their empire, and let Germany become a world power, rather than lose the empire at the cost of keeping Germany less powerful. This theory sparked a naval arms race between the German and British Empires in the first decade of the 20th century.

This theory was based on the assumption that Britain would have to send its fleet into the North Sea to blockade the German ports (blockading Germany was the only way the Royal Navy could seriously harm Germany), where the German Navy could force a battle. However, due to Germany's geographic location, Britain could blockade Germany by closing the entrance to the North Sea in the English Channel and the area between Bergen and the Shetland Islands. Faced with this option a German admiral commented, "If the British do that, the role of our navy will be a sad one", correctly predicting the role the surface fleet would have during the First World War.

Politically and strategically, Tirpitz's risk theory ensured its own failure. By its very nature it forced Britain into measures that would have been previously unacceptable to the British establishment. The necessity to concentrate the fleet against the German threat involved Britain making arrangements with other powers that enabled her to return the bulk of her naval forces to home waters. The first evidence of this is seen in the Anglo-Japanese treaty of 1902 that enabled the battleships of the China squadron to be re-allocated back to Europe. The Japanese fleet, largely constructed in British shipyards, then proceeded to utterly destroy the Russian Navy in the war of 1904–05, removing Russia as a credible maritime opponent. The necessity to reduce the Mediterranean Fleet in order to reinforce the navy in home waters was also a powerful influence in its détente and Entente Cordiale with the French. By forcing the British to come to terms with its most traditional opponent, Tirpitz scuttled his own policy. Britain was no longer at risk from France, and the Japanese destruction of the Russian fleet removed that nation as a naval threat. In the space of a few years, Germany was faced with virtually the whole strength of the Royal Navy deployed against its own fleet, and Britain committed to her list of potential enemies. The Tirpitz risk theory made it more probable that, in any future conflict between the European powers, Britain would be on the side of Germany's foes, and that the full force of the most powerful navy in the world would be concentrated against her fleet.

Tirpitz had been made a Großadmiral (grand admiral) in 1911, without patent (the document that accompanied formal promotions personally signed at this level by the Kaiser himself). At that time, the German Imperial Navy had only four ranks for admirals: rear admiral, (Konteradmiral, equal to a Generalmajor in the army, with no pips on the shoulders); vice admiral (Vizeadmiral, equal to a Generalleutnant, with one pip); admiral (equal to a General der Infanterie, with two pips), and grand admiral (equal to a field marshal). Tirpitz's shoulder boards had four pips, but he never received a grand admiral's baton or the associated insignia.

==== World War I ====
Despite the building programme he oversaw, he believed that the war had come too soon for a successful surface challenge to the Royal Navy, as the Fleet Act of 1900 had included a seventeen-year timetable. Unable to direct naval operations from his purely administrative position, Tirpitz became a vocal spokesman for unrestricted U-boat warfare, which he felt could strangle Britain's supply of food and force them to terms. While the German Navy abandoned the observance of cruiser rules in 1915, this policy was reversed following the outcry over the Lusitania's sinking. Tirpitz, a popular figure ("on account of his aggressiveness and his beard", according to US ambassador James W. Gerard), had agitated against all restrictions using the German press, and threats to resign, and began to fall out with the Kaiser as a result. When the restrictions on the submarine war were not lifted, he finally resigned on 15 March 1916. He was replaced as State Secretary of the Imperial Naval Office by Eduard von Capelle.

Despite his support for unrestricted U-boat warfare, Tirpitz placed a low priority on submarine construction during his leadership of the Imperial Naval Office. Ultimately, this decision would result in a severe shortage of newly built U-boats by 1917.

== Fatherland Party ==
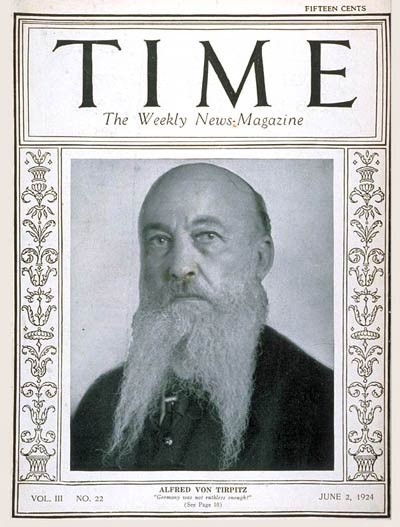
Time cover, 2 June 1924

In September 1917 Grand Admiral Tirpitz became a co-founder of the Pan-Germanic and nationalist Fatherland Party (Deutsche Vaterlandspartei). The party was organised jointly by Heinrich Claß, Konrad Freiherr von Wangenheim, Tirpitz as chairman and Wolfgang Kapp as his deputy. The party attracted the opponents of a negotiated peace; it organised opposition to the parliamentary majority in the Reichstag, which was seeking peace negotiations. It sought to bring together outside parliament all parties on the political right, which had not previously been done. At its peak, in the summer of 1918, the party had around 1,250,000 members. It proposed both Generalfeldmarschall Paul von Hindenburg and General Erich Ludendorff as "people's emperors" of a military state whose legitimacy was based on war and on war aims instead of on the parliamentary government of the Reich. Internally, there were calls for a coup d'etat against the German government, to be led by Hindenburg and Ludendorff, even against the Kaiser if necessary. Tirpitz's experience with the Navy League and with mass political agitation convinced him that the means for a coup was at hand.

Tirpitz considered that one of the main aims of the war must be annexation of new territory in the west, to allow Germany to develop into a world power. This meant holding the Belgian ports of Zeebrugge and Ostend, with an eye to the main enemy, the United Kingdom. He proposed a separate peace treaty with Russia, giving them access to the ocean. Germany would be a great continental state but could maintain its world position only by expanding world trade and continuing the fight against the UK. He complained of indecision and ambiguity in German policy, humanitarian ideas of self-preservation, a policy of appeasement of neutrals at the expense of vital German interests, and begging for peace. He called for vigorous warfare without regard for diplomatic and commercial consequences, and supported the most extreme use of weapons, especially unrestricted submarine warfare.

The Fatherland Party had ceased its operations by February 1919.

From 1908 to 1918 Tirpitz served as a member of the Prussian House of Lords.

== After 1918 ==
After Germany's defeat Tirpitz supported the right-wing German National People's Party (Deutschnationale Volkspartei, or DNVP) and sat for it in the Reichstag from 1924 until 1928.

Tirpitz died in Ebenhausen, near Munich, on 6 March 1930. He is buried in the Waldfriedhof in Munich.

== Commemoration ==
The Tirpitz Range on the island of New Hanover in Papua New Guinea takes its name from Alfred von Tirpitz.

== Honours ==
- Honorary doctorates from the universities of Göttingen, 16 June 1913; and Greifswald
- Honorary doctorate of engineering from the Technische Hochschule Charlottenburg
- Freeman of the city of Frankfurt (Oder), 15 January 1917
- The German battleship Tirpitz.
- Tirpitzia, a genus of plants from China and Asia (the family Linaceae), was named after him in 1921 by Johannes Gottfried Hallier.

German orders and decorations

- Prussia:
  - Knight of the Royal Crown Order, 2nd Class, 3 September 1892; with Star
  - Knight of the Red Eagle, 2nd Class with Oak Leaves, 18 January 1897; with Star, 27 January 1899; Grand Cross with Crown and Swords on Ring
  - Commander's Cross of the Royal House Order of Hohenzollern, with Star, 13 September 1901; Grand Commander's Cross with Swords
  - Knight of the Black Eagle, 01 June 1912; with Collar in Diamonds 2 august 1914
  - Service Award Cross
  - Pour le Mérite (military), 10 August 1915
  - Iron Cross, 1st Class
- Brunswick: Grand Cross of the Order of Henry the Lion, 1902
- Baden:
  - Grand Cross of the Zähringer Lion, with Oak Leaves, 1899; with Golden Collar, 1901
  - Knight of the House Order of Fidelity
- Bavaria: Grand Cross of the Military Merit Order
- Bremen: Hanseatic Cross
- (Saxe-Coburg and Gotha) (Duchy of Saxe-Altenburg) (Saxe-Meiningen) Ernestine duchies: Grand Cross of the Saxe-Ernestine House Order
- Hesse and by Rhine: Grand Cross of the Merit Order of Philip the Magnanimous, with Crown, 18 September 1903
- (Principality of Schaumburg-Lippe) Lippe: Cross of Honour of the House Order of Lippe
- Mecklenburg-Schwerin: Grand Cross of the Griffon
- Oldenburg: Grand Cross of the Order of Duke Peter Friedrich Ludwig, with Golden Crown
- Saxe-Weimar-Eisenach: Grand Cross of the White Falcon
- Saxony:
  - Grand Cross of the Albert Order, 1899
  - Knight of the Rue Crown
- Württemberg:
  - Grand Cross of the Friedrich Order, 1898
  - Grand Cross of the Württemberg Crown

Foreign orders and decorations

- Austria-Hungary:
  - Grand Cross of the Order of Franz Joseph, 1895
  - Grand Cross of the Imperial Order of Leopold, 1900
  - Grand Cross of the Royal Hungarian Order of St. Stephen, 1911
- Belgium: Grand Cordon of the Order of Leopold
- Kingdom of Bulgaria: Grand Cross of St. Alexander
- Denmark: Grand Cross of the Dannebrog, 31 December 1906
- France: Commander of the Legion of Honour
- Kingdom of Greece: Grand Cross of the Redeemer
- Kingdom of Italy:
  - Grand Cross of Saints Maurice and Lazarus
  - Grand Officer of the Crown of Italy
- Empire of Japan: Grand Cordon of the Rising Sun, with Paulownia Flowers
- Norway: Grand Cross of St. Olav, 15 December 1906
- Ottoman Empire: Order of Osmanieh, 1st Class
- Qing dynasty: Order of the Double Dragon, Class II Grade I
- Kingdom of Romania: Grand Cross of the Star of Romania
- Russian Empire:
  - Knight of St. Alexander Nevsky, in Diamonds, August 1902 – during the visit of the German Emperor to the Russian fleet maneuvers in Reval.
  - Knight of the White Eagle
- Spain:
  - Grand Cross of Naval Merit, with White Decoration, 1902
  - Grand Cross of the Order of Charles III, 2 November 1905
  - Grand Cross of Military Merit
- Sweden:
  - Commander of the Sword, 2nd Class, 1890
  - Commander Grand Cross of the Order of Vasa, 1908
- United Kingdom: Honorary Grand Cross of the Royal Victorian Order, 1 July 1904 – during the visit of King Edward VII to Kiel.

== Works ==
- Erinnerungen (1919, online)
  - My memories (Vol I, 1919)
  - My memories (Vol II, 1919)
  - My Memoirs. London/ New York. 1919.
- Der Aufbau der deutschen Weltmacht. Stuttgart/ Berlin. 1924.
- Politische Dokumente. Deutsche Ohnmachtspolitik im Weltkriege. Hamburg/Berlin. 1926.

== See also ==
- Anglo-German naval arms race
- German interest in the Caribbean

== Bibliography ==
=== Works ===
- Tirpitz, Alfred von, Erinnerungen (Leipzig: K.F.Koehler, 1919).

=== Secondary source ===
- Berghahn, V.R. Germany and the Approach of War in 1914 (Macmillan, 1973). pp. 25–42
- Berghahn, Volker Rolf. Der Tirpitz-Plan (Droste Verlag, 1971). in German
- Bird, Keith. "The Tirpitz Legacy: The Political Ideology of German Sea Power," Journal of Military History, July 2005, Vol. 69 Issue 3, pp. 821–825
- Bönker, Dirk. Militarism in a Global Age: Naval Ambitions in Germany and the United States before World War I (2012) excerpt and text search; online review
- Bönker, Dirk. "Global Politics and Germany's Destiny 'from an East Asian Perspective': Alfred von Tirpitz and the Making of Wilhelmine Navalism." Central European History 46.1 (2013): 61–96.
- Clark, Sir Christopher, The Sleepwalkers: How Europe Went to War in 1914 (New York: Harper 2013)
- Epkenhans, Michael. Tirpitz: Architect of the German High Seas Fleet (2008) excerpt and text search, 106pp
- Herwig, Holger H., 'Admirals versus Generals: The War Aims of Imperial German Navy 1914–1918', Central European History 5 (1972), pp. 208–233.
- Hobson, Rolf. Imperialism at Sea: Naval Strategic Thought, the Ideology of Sea Power, and the Tirpitz Plan, 1875–1914 (Brill, 2002)
- Hulsman, John C. "To Dare More Boldly: The Audacious Story of Political Risk" (Princeton UP, 2018 ) ch 9 on "1898-1912: the promised land fallacy: Von Tirpitz disastrously builds a Navy." Pp 209–232.
- Kelly, Patrick J. "Strategy, Tactics, and Turf Wars: Tirpitz and the Oberkommando der Marine, 1892–1895," Journal of Military History, October 2002, Vol. 66 Issue 4, pp. 1033–1060
- Kennedy, Paul. The rise and fall of British naval mastery (2017) pp. 205–239.
- Kelly, Patrick J. (2011). Tirpitz and the Imperial German Navy. Bloomington, Indiana: Indiana University Press. ISBN 978-0253355935.
- Massie, Robert K. (1992). Dreadnought: Britain, Germany, and the Coming of the Great War. London: Jonathan Cape. ISBN 0-224-03260-7.
- Saunders, George (1922). "Tirpitz, Alfred von" . Encyclopædia Britannica (12th ed.).

=== Primary sources ===
- Marinearchiv, Der Krieg zur zee 1914–1918 (18 vols, Berlin and Frankfurt: E.S.Mittler & Sohn, 1932–66).
- Marinearchiv, Der Krieg zur See 1914–1918. Der Handelskrieg mit U-Booten (5 vols., Berlin: E.S. Mittler & Sohn, 1923–66).

Political offices
Preceded by Friedrich von Hollmann	State Secretary of the Imperial German Navy; 1897–1916	Succeeded by Eduard von Capelle
Awards and achievements
Preceded by Sir James Craig	Cover of Time magazine 2 June 1924	Succeeded by Carter Glass
