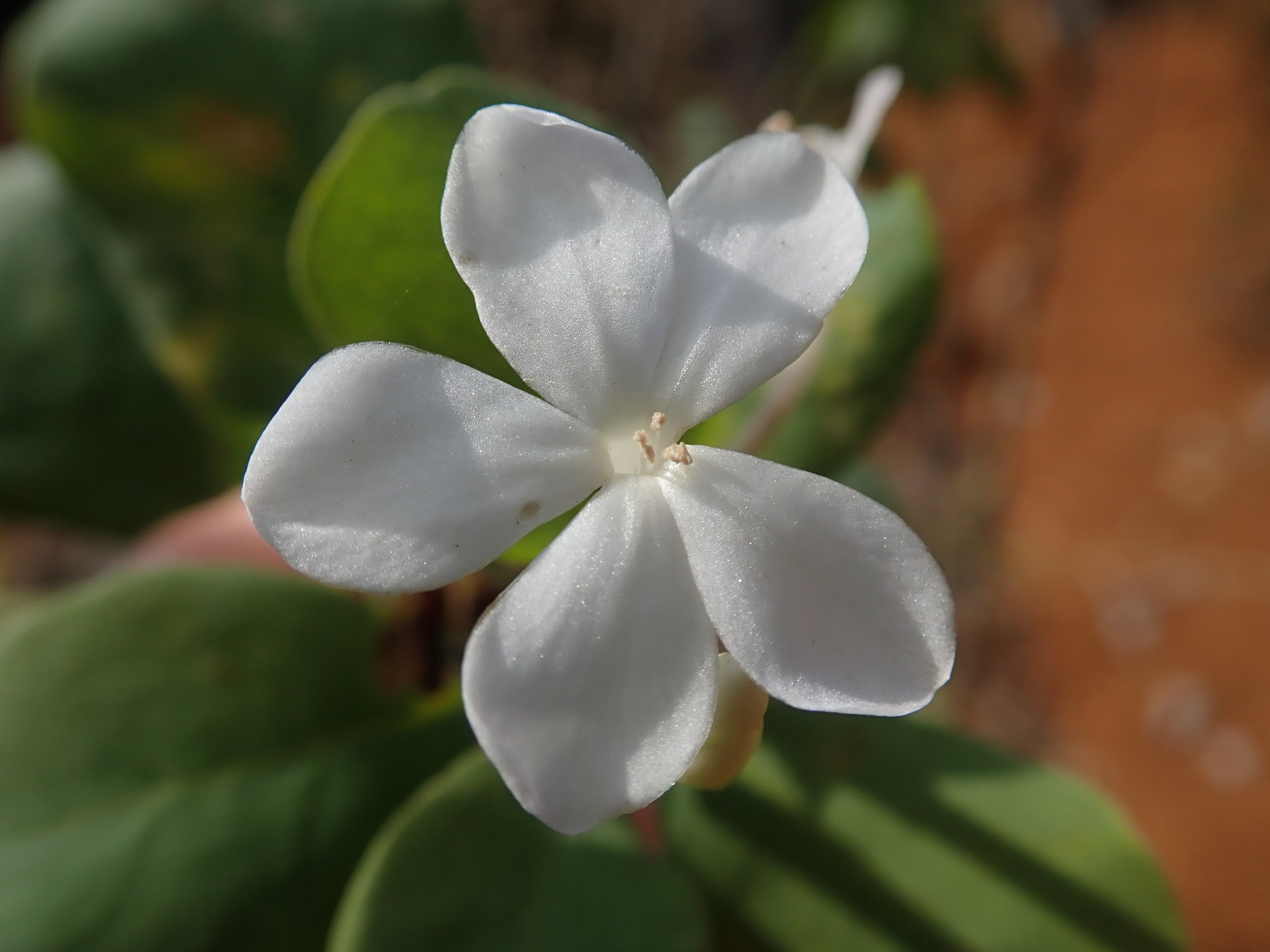
- Tirpitzia sinensis

Scientific classification
- Kingdom: Plantae
- Clade: Tracheophytes
- Clade: Angiosperms
- Clade: Eudicots
- Clade: Rosids
- Order: Malpighiales
- Family: Linaceae
- Subfamily: Linoideae
- Genus: Tirpitzia; Hallier f.

= Tirpitzia =

Genus of flowering plants

Tirpitzia is a genus of flowering plants belonging to the family Linaceae. It is also in the subfamily Linoideae.

Its native range is southern China to Vietnam and Taiwan.

The genus name of Tirpitzia is in honour of Alfred von Tirpitz (1849–1930), a German grand admiral, Secretary of State of the German Imperial Naval Office. It was first described and published in Beih. Bot. Centralbl. Vol.39 (Issue 2) on page 5 in 1921.

== Known species ==
According to Kew:

- Tirpitzia bilocularis Suksathan & K.Larsen
- Tirpitzia ovoidea Chun & F.C.How ex W.L.Sha
- Tirpitzia sinensis (Hemsl.) Hallier f.
