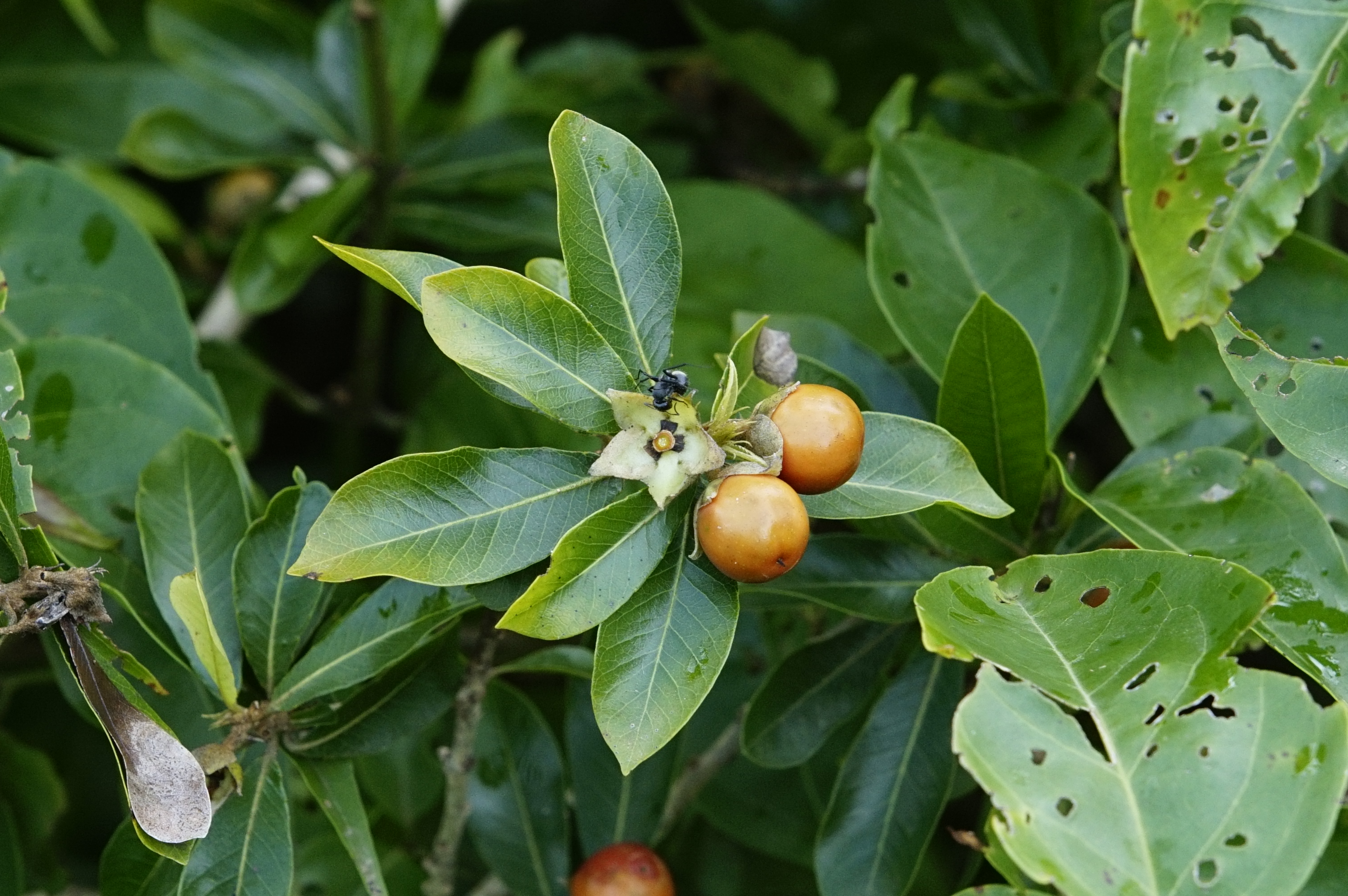
- Hugonia mystax

Scientific classification
- Kingdom: Plantae
- Clade: Tracheophytes
- Clade: Angiosperms
- Clade: Eudicots
- Clade: Rosids
- Order: Malpighiales
- Family: Linaceae
- Subfamily: Hugonioideae
- Genus: Hugonia; L.

= Hugonia =

Genus of flowering plants

Hugonia is a genus of plant in the family Linaceae. The genus was named by Linnaeus after Augustus Johann von Hugo (1686-1760) of Hannover.

Species include:

- Hugonia deplanchei
- Hugonia jenkinsii
- Hugonia macrophylla Oliv.
- Hugonia micans Engl.
- Hugonia mystax L.
- Hugonia planchonii Hook.f.
