= Navy League (Germany) =

German naval promotion organization

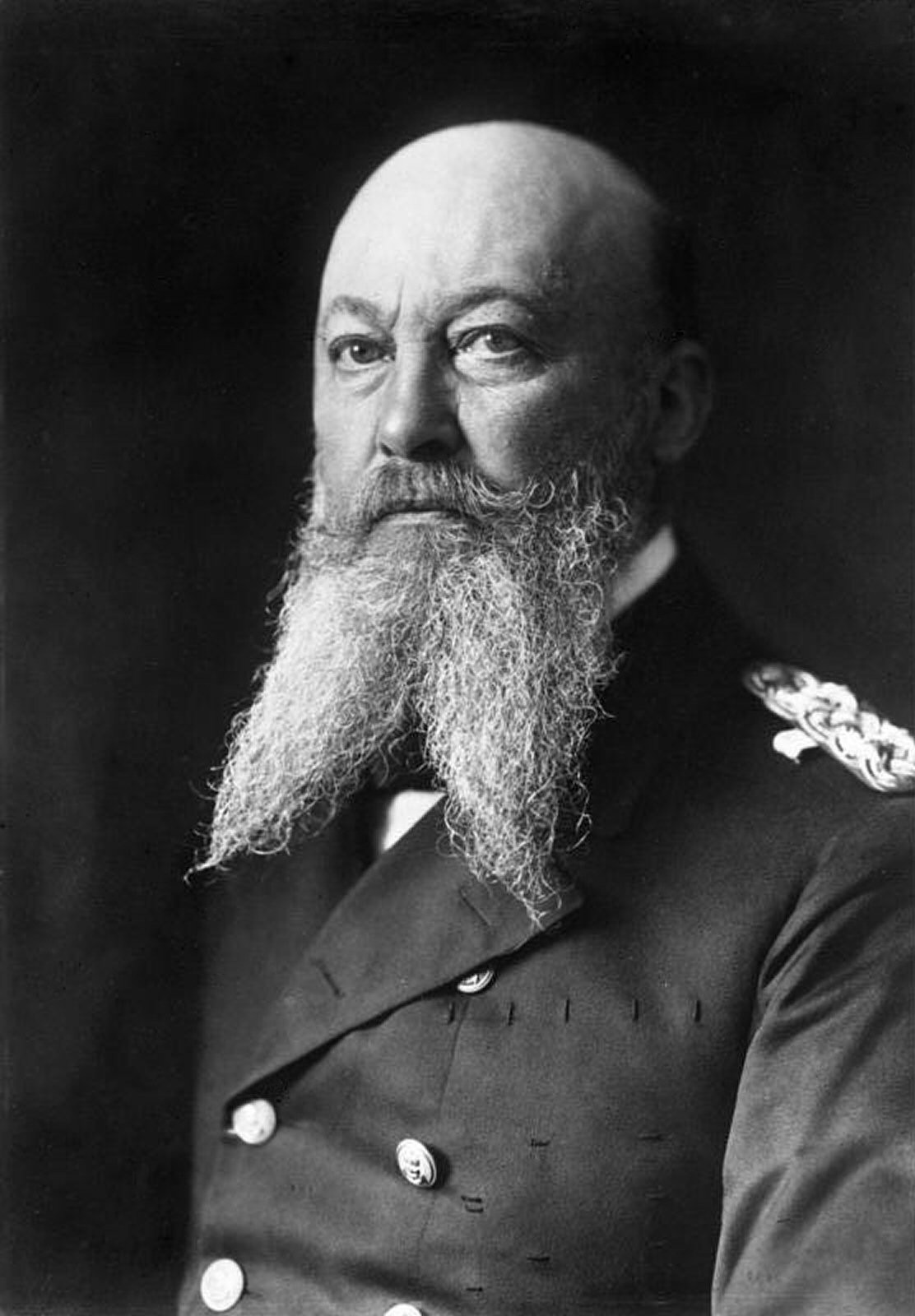
Alfred von Tirpitz, 1903

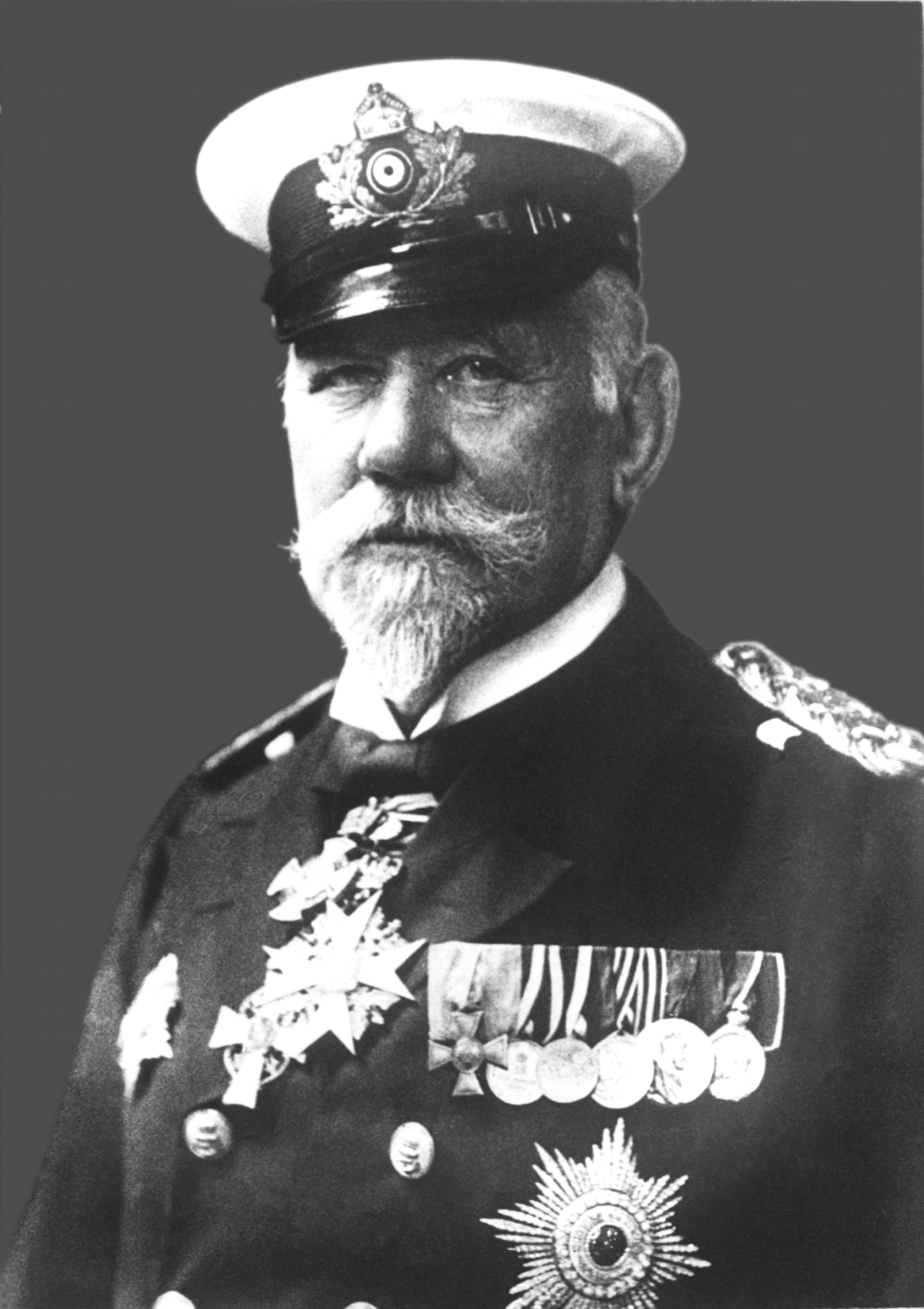
Hans von Koester

The Navy League or Fleet Association (German: Deutscher Flottenverein) in Imperial Germany was an interest group formed on April 30, 1898 on initiative of Admiral Alfred von Tirpitz through the German Imperial Naval Office (Reichsmarineamt) which he headed (1897–1916) to support the expansion of the Imperial German Navy (Kaiserliche Marine). Specifically it was intended to develop popular pressure on the German parliament (Reichstag) to approve the Fleet Acts of 1898 and 1900, and the attendant expenses.

== Background ==
The unification of Germany under Prussian leadership in 1871 was the defining point for the desire of German nationalists to have a great, world class navy. The newly created emperor, Wilhelm I, as king of Prussia, was head of state of the strongest state forming part of the new empire. His Prussian Navy had become the navy of the North German Confederation in 1867, and now became the Imperial German Navy.

The Prussian Navy and that of the North German Confederation had been relatively small with the limited purpose of protecting the Baltic and North Sea coasts and 'showing the flag' around the world.

The German naval policy changed decisively upon the accession of Kaiser Wilhelm II in 1888 and the resignation of Chancellor Otto von Bismarck two years later. As the Scramble for Africa intensified, Germany's ambitions shifted from a European context to a world scene Weltpolitik. Germany's leaders sought a place in the sun which they believed to be commensurate with its rising industrial strength, primarily by the creation of a colonial empire to rival those of other powers. A world class fleet was increasingly regarded as an instrument of power to enforce German interests, culminating in the establishment of the Reichsmarineamt in 1889. In 1897 Tirpitz, a follower of Alfred Thayer Mahan's theories about The Influence of Sea Power Upon History, became its Secretary of State. He widely influenced the Empire's foreign and security policy according to his concept that a strong German navy would be indispensable to change the balance of power by building a Risikoflotte (risk fleet) that would make it impossible for the Royal Navy to defeat Germany without suffering irreplaceable losses in manpower and capital ships.

Influential circles in the German government, headed by state secretary for foreign affairs Bernhard von Bülow supported the foundation of the league. It aimed to mobilize popular sentiment in favor of a more powerful German navy and to work on behalf of its expansion. The early propaganda of the Navy League contained an array of economic slogans which were aimed at gaining the support of industry and commerce. Soon, the threat of the working class movement was added to the arguments.

== Fleet Acts ==
Tirpitz introduced the First Fleet Act at the Reichstag in 1898. This was followed by the Second Fleet Act in 1900, to construct a fleet capable of matching the Royal Navy, with a 17-year deadline for the construction of a fleet of two flagships, 36 battleships, 11 large and 34 small cruisers.

By June 15, 1897, Tirpitz presented the Kaiser with a revision of Wilhelm's naval construction bill. By October 29, 1897, Tirpitz had obliged the parliament to pass the bill with minor modifications. Debates over final approval of the bill, however, extended from June 1897 to April 1898. The joint efforts of the Kaiser and the mercantile class paid off. Despite a large opposition in the Reichstag against passage of the bill, above all from the Social Democrats, it was passed on April 10, 1898.

== Effects ==
Beside the influence on political decisions, the league’s aim was to strengthen the understanding and interest of the German people for the importance and duties of the fleet. It was also to be pursued by the dissemination of the information through the written and spoken word. These efforts aroused a widespread enthusiasm for the navy, reflected by several magazines and adventure books right up to collectible cards and sailor suits for children. In 1898, the Navy League had over 300,000 fee paying members and 770,000 affiliated through other organizations. This became the largest organization of its kind in Germany and incomparably one of the largest of all naval organizations elsewhere. At the eve of World War I it had attracted more than one million members, including individuals as well as numerous corporations and companies like Krupp.

Although the nationalist associations claimed to be non-political, the gradual radicalization of their political positions was their most distinctive characteristic. At the turn of the 20th century, leaders and members naively claimed that the League was a “supra-party” organization devoted to rallying all patriotic forces in general support of the Kaiser’s naval and world policy.

In 1905, when the British introduced the Dreadnought battleship class, Germany was prompted to increase the size of her battleships with the Nassau class as well. Despite opposition within Germany, even from Bülow, Chancellor from 1900–1909, naval expansion continued with construction costs increasing proportionally. Support provided by the Navy League, founded partly to influence the passage of pet naval bills, combined with large industrial concerns made this possible. Contrary to Tirpitz' ideas, the capital ships of the German Navy played no decisive part in World War I.

The Navy League was influential in other causes, however. Between 1890 and 1913, Germany's population swelled by 40%. Meanwhile, Germany had become the premier producer of steel in Europe and large shifts in the population throughout the country created not only a new consumer class but a large and growing working class. Germany's mercantile class, composed mainly of economically progressive liberals, represented for the most part the left wing of the Reichstag. In opposition to this party, the old Prussian aristocracy stood on the right. The Catholic Center party was center, with members who tended to be either neutral or conservative. Marxist organizations both within and beyond Germany that were instigating fierce resistance to "Prussianism" grew rapidly in the late 19th century.

By 1912, the Social Democrats had managed to win a third of all votes cast. As in the rest of Europe, Germany's rising working class became more militant, with union-led strike movements and class tension arising. The rise of the Social Democrats led to fears in middle class circles of a breakdown in society, a weakening of government and general anarchy. As a reaction, groups like the Pan-German League and the German Navy League tried to curb the influence of the Social Democrats.
