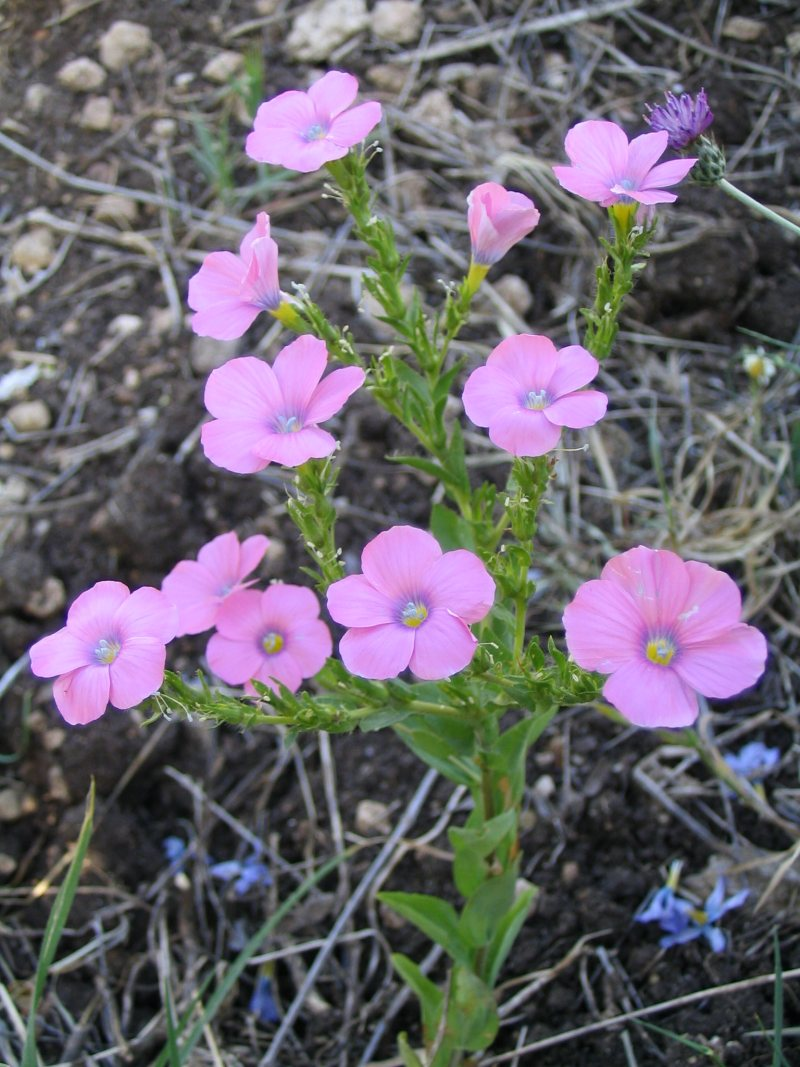
- Linum pubescens

Scientific classification
- Kingdom: Plantae
- Clade: Tracheophytes
- Clade: Angiosperms
- Clade: Eudicots
- Clade: Rosids
- Order: Malpighiales
- Family: Linaceae; DC. ex Perleb

Genera
- See text

= Linaceae =

Family of flowering plants

Linaceae is a family of flowering plants. The family is cosmopolitan, and includes about 250 species in 14 genera, classified into two subfamilies: the Linoideae and Hugonioideae.

== Description ==
The leaves of the Linaceae are always simple; arrangement varies from alternate (most species) to opposite (in Sclerolinon and some Linum) or whorled (in some Hesperolinon and Linum species). The hermaphroditic, actinomorphic flowers are pentameric or, very rarely, tetrameric (e.g., Radiola linoides, Linum keniense).

== Taxonomy ==
Under the old Cronquist system of classifying the flowering plants, the Linaceae were placed in their own order, the Linales. Modern classifications place them in the order Malpighiales.

In addition to their growth habits and geographic distributions, the two subfamilies can be differentiated by the number of fertile stamens (five in the Linoideae, ten in the Hugonioideae) and fruit type (capsules in the Linoideae, fleshy drupe-like fruits in the Hugonioideae).

=== Subfamily Linoideae ===
The largest genus of the Linoideae is Linum, the flaxes, with 180–200 species including the cultivated flax, L. usitatissimum. Members of the Linoideae include herbaceous annuals and perennials, as well as woody subshrubs, shrubs, and small trees (Tirpitzia) inhabiting temperate and tropical latitudes of Eurasia, Africa, Australia, and the Americas.

- Anisadenia Wall. ex Meisn. (2 sp.)
- Hesperolinon (Gray) Small (13 sp.)
- Linum L. (approximately 200 species)
- Radiola Hill (1 sp.)
- Reinwardtia Dumort. (1 sp.)
- Sclerolinon C.M.Rogers (1 sp.)
- Tirpitzia Hallier f. (3 sp.)

Formerly included: Cliococca (synonym of Linum L.)

=== Subfamily Hugonioideae ===
The Hugonioideae subfamily is often recognized as a distinct family, the Hugoniaceae.

The largest genus of the Hugonioideae is Hugonia (about 40 species); the Hugonioideae are woody vines, shrubs, and trees, and are almost entirely tropical in distribution.

- Hebepetalum Benth. (3 sp.)
- Hugonia l. (6 sp.)
- Indorouchera Hallier f. (1 sp.)
- Roucheria Planch. (7 sp.)

Formerly included: Durandea (synonym of Hugonia L.) and Philbornea (synonym of Hugonia L.)
