= Perilla nankinensis =

Perilla nankinensis may refer to:

- Perilla nankinensis (Lour.) Decne. – synonym of Perilla frutescens var. crispa
- Perilla nankinensis Wender. – synonym of Plectranthus scutellarioides
