= Begonia gironellae =

Scientific classification
- Kingdom: Plantae
- Clade: Tracheophytes
- Clade: Angiosperms
- Clade: Eudicots
- Clade: Rosids
- Order: Cucurbitales
- Family: Begoniaceae
- Genus: Begonia
- Species: B. gironellae

Binomial name
- Begonia gironellae C.I Peng & Rubite & C.W.Lin

Species of flowering plant

Begonia gironellae, the Bess Begonia, is an endemic species of Begonia discovered in Tanabag, Puerto Princesa, in northern Palawan, Philippines. The species resembled Begonia cleopatrae, in that both species have widely ovate, variegated leaves, and fleshy hairs fused into a ring at the base of the leaf petiole. However, Begonia gironellae differed from B. cleopatrae due to its rosette habit with rhizome shorter to 5 cm long, with very congested internodes, widely triangular stipules, differently-sized lamina and bracts, and capsule with wider abaxial wing. Additionally, B. gironellae is a lowland species occurring in broadleaved seaside forests, while B. cleopatrae grows on hill forest at ca. 400m.

== Etymology ==
The species is named in honor of Prof. Elizabeth P. Gironella of the Palawan State University.
