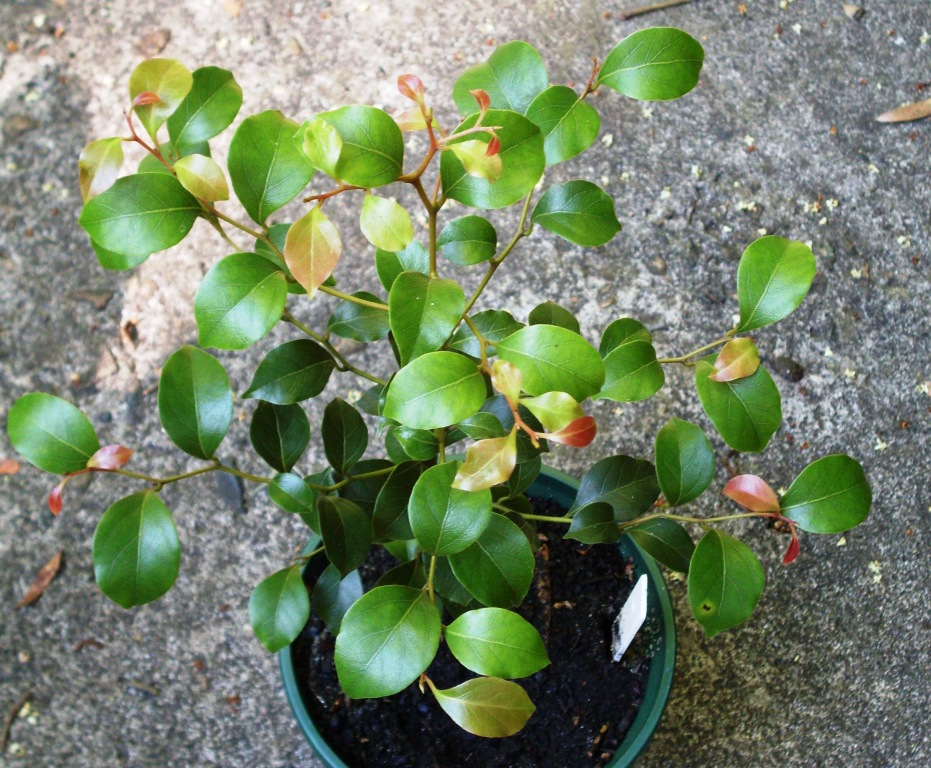

Conservation status
- Endangered (IUCN 3.1)

- Vulnerable (EPBC Act)

Scientific classification
- Kingdom: Plantae
- Clade: Tracheophytes
- Clade: Angiosperms
- Clade: Magnoliids
- Order: Laurales
- Family: Lauraceae
- Genus: Cryptocarya
- Species: C. williwilliana

Binomial name
- Cryptocarya williwilliana B.Hyland & A.G.Floyd

= Cryptocarya williwilliana =

Species of tree

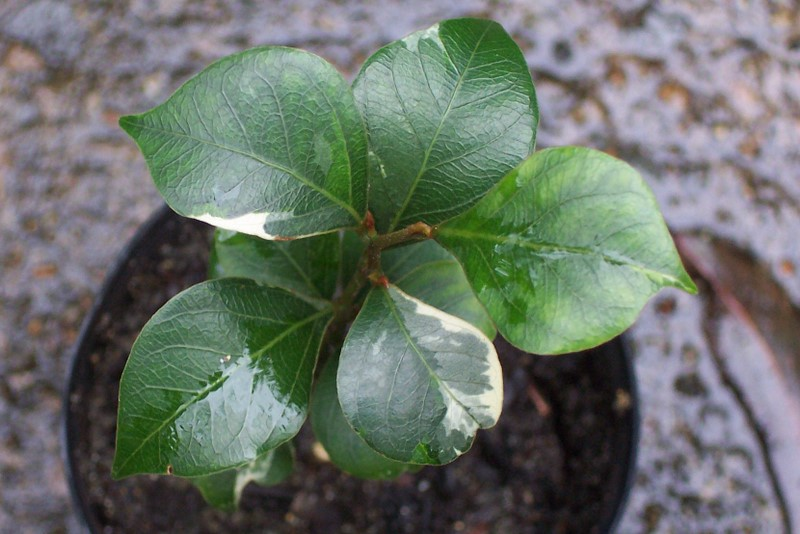
Small leaved laurel, showing leaf venation and variegated leaves

Cryptocarya williwilliana, commonly known as small-leaved laurel, is a species of flowering plant in the laurel family and is endemic to near Kempsey in northern New South Wales. It is a tree or shrub with egg-shaped or lance-shaped leaves, the flowers creamy-green and perfumed, and the fruit a spherical to elliptic, black drupe.

== Description ==
Cryptocarya williwilliana is a tree or shrub that typically grows to a height of 6 m (20 ft) and has fluted twigs. Its leaves are egg-shaped to broadly elliptic or lance-shaped,15–40 mm (0.59–1.57 in) long and 5–20 mm (0.20–0.79 in) wide on a petiole 3–4 mm (0.12–0.16 in) long. The flowers are creamy-green and perfumed, usually arranged in a raceme in leaf axils, but shorter than the leaves, the perianth tube 1.3–2 mm (0.051–0.079 in) long and 0.9–1 mm (0.035–0.039 in) wide and hairy inside near the tip. The tepals are softly-hairy, the outer tepals 1.4–2.0 mm (0.055–0.079 in) long and 1.0–1.2 mm (0.039–0.047 in) wide, the inner tepals 1.5–2.1 mm (0.059–0.083 in) long and 1.1–1.4 mm (0.043–0.055 in) wide, the outer anthers 0.5–0.7 mm (0.020–0.028 in) long and wide, the inner anthers 0.6–0.8 mm (0.024–0.031 in) long and 0.4–0.6 mm (0.016–0.024 in) wide. Flowering occurs from October to January, and the fruit is a spherical to elliptic black drupe 10–12 mm (0.39–0.47 in) long and 8.5–11 mm (0.33–0.43 in) wide.

== Taxonomy ==
Cryptocarya williwilliana was first formally described in 1989 by Bernard Hyland and Alex Floyd in Australian Systematic Botany, from specimens collected by Hyland near Willi Willi in 1982.

== Distribution and habitat ==
Small-leaved laurel is confined to dry rainforest on limestone near Willi Willi in the Macleay River valley at altitudes of 250–800 m (820–2,620 ft).
