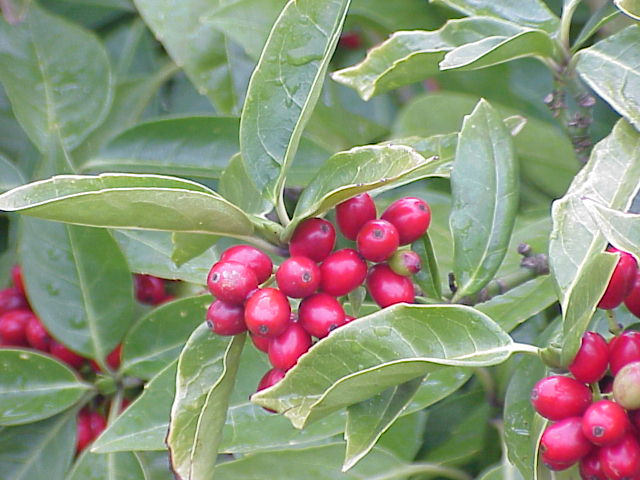
- Aucuba japonica

Scientific classification
- Kingdom: Plantae
- Clade: Tracheophytes
- Clade: Angiosperms
- Clade: Eudicots
- Clade: Asterids
- Order: Garryales
- Family: Garryaceae
- Genus: Aucuba; Thunb.

Synonyms
- Eubasis Salisb.

= Aucuba =

Genus of flowering plants

Aucuba is a genus of three to ten species of flowering plants, now placed in the family Garryaceae, although formerly classified in the Aucubaceae or Cornaceae.

Aucuba species are native to eastern Asia, from the eastern Himalayas east to China, Korea, and Japan. The name is a latinization of Japanese Aokiba. They are evergreen shrubs or small trees 2–13 m tall, similar in appearance to the laurels of the genus Laurus, having glossy, leathery leaves, and are among the shrubs that are mistakenly called laurels in gardens.

The leaves are opposite, broad lanceolate, 8–25 cm long and 2–7 cm broad, with a few large teeth on the margin near the apex of the leaf. Aucubas are dioecious, having separate male and female plants. Flowers are small, 4–8 mm diameter, each with four purplish-brown petals; 10-30 are in loose cymes. Fruit are red drupes about 1 cm in diameter.

== Species ==
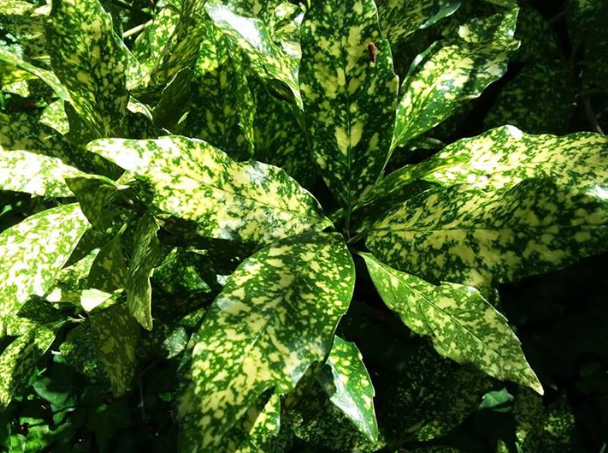
Species with leaves of variegated color

Three species (A. chinensis, A. himalaica, A. japonica) have traditionally been accepted, but more recently Flora of China and Plants of the World Online accept ten species:

1. Aucuba albopunctifolia – Southern China. Shrub to 2–6 m tall.
2. Aucuba chinensis – Southern China, Taiwan, Myanmar, northern Vietnam. Shrub to 3–6 m tall.
3. Aucuba chlorascens – Southwest China (Yunnan). Shrub to 7 m tall.
4. Aucuba confertiflora – Southwest China (Yunnan). Shrub to 4 m tall.
5. Aucuba eriobotryifolia – Southwest China (Yunnan). Small tree to 13 m tall.
6. Aucuba filicauda – Southern China. Shrub to 4 m tall.
7. Aucuba himalaica – Eastern Himalaya, southern China, northern Myanmar. Small tree to 8–10 m tall.
8. Aucuba japonica – Southern Japan, southern Korea, Taiwan, southeast China (Zhejiang). Shrub to 4 m tall.
9. Aucuba obcordata – Southern China. Shrub to 4 m tall.
10. Aucuba robusta – Southern China (Guangxi). Shrub.
