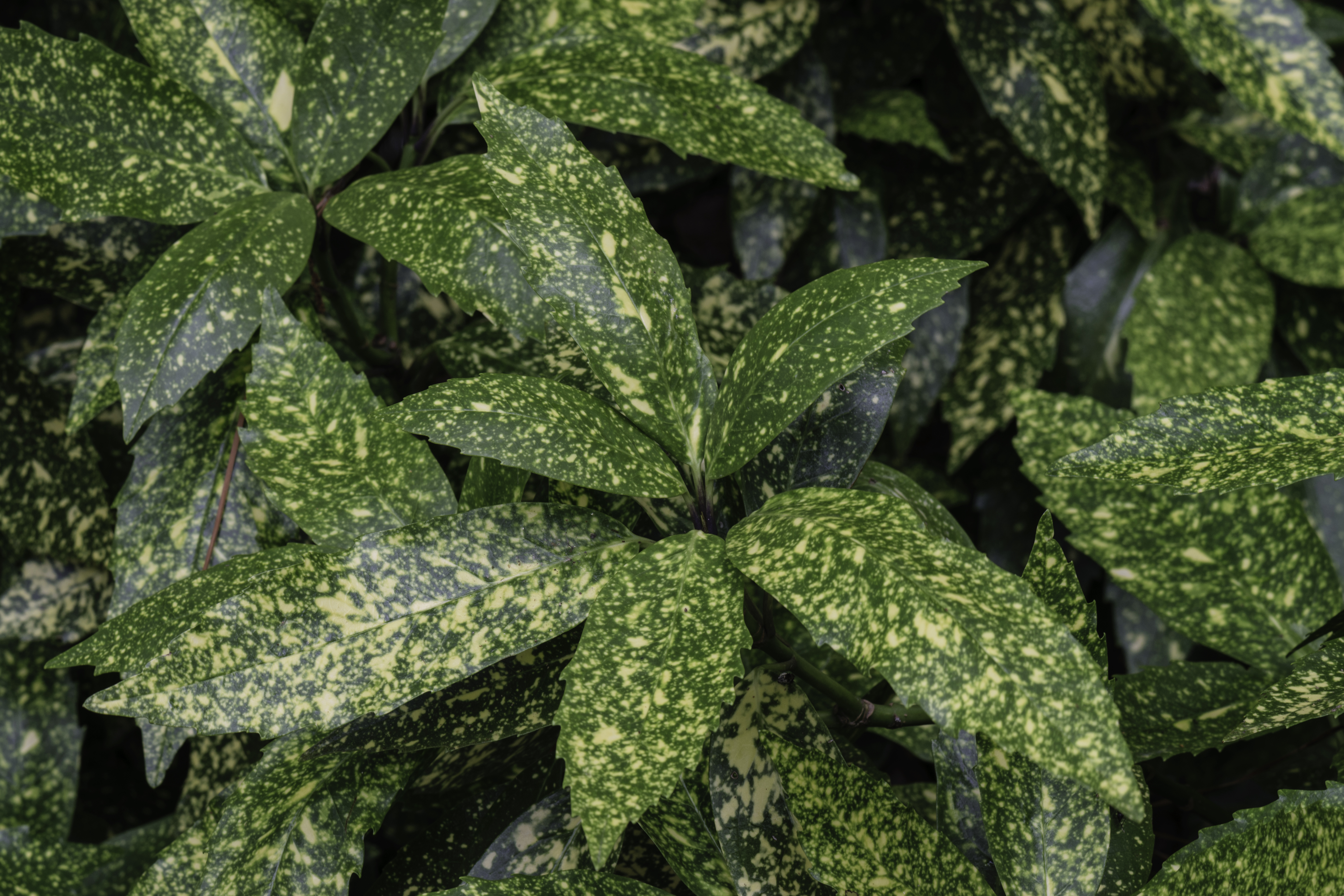
- Aucuba japonica

Scientific classification
- Kingdom: Plantae
- Clade: Tracheophytes
- Clade: Angiosperms
- Clade: Eudicots
- Clade: Asterids
- Order: Garryales
- Family: Garryaceae
- Genus: Aucuba
- Species: A. japonica

Binomial name
- Aucuba japonica Thunb.

Synonyms
- Aucuba vivicans W.Bull

= Aucuba japonica =

Spotted laurel

Species of plant

Aucuba japonica, commonly called spotted laurel, Japanese laurel, Japanese aucuba or gold dust plant (U.S.), is a shrub (1–5 m, 3.3–16.4 ft) native to rich forest soils of moist valleys, thickets, by streams and near shaded moist rocks in China, Korea, and Japan. This is the species of Aucuba commonly seen in gardens - often in variegated form. The leaves are opposite, broad lanceolate, 5–8 cm (2.0–3.1 in) long and 2–5 cm (0.79–1.97 in) wide. Aucuba japonica are dioecious. The flowers are small, 4–8 mm (0.16–0.31 in) diameter, each with four purplish-brown petals; they are produced in clusters of 10-30 in a loose cyme. The fruit is a red drupe approximately 1 cm (0.39 in) in diameter that is avoided by birds.

The golden variegation patterns are inherited from the mother plant. If the female plant is variegated, the seedlings will be variegated regardless of what the male looks like. If the female plant is green and male is variegated, the seedlings will be green. This indicates that the cause of variegation is not under the control of the DNA of the nucleus, but probably under the control of the chloroplasts where photosynthesis occurs. Chloroplasts float in the cytoplasm of each cell and are inherited from the female parent.

== History ==
Aucuba japonica was introduced into England in 1783 by Philip Miller's pupil John Graeffer, at first as a plant for a heated greenhouse. It became widely cultivated as the "gold plant" by 19th-century gardeners. The plants being grown were female, and it was a purpose of Robert Fortune's botanizing trip to newly opened Japan in 1861 to locate a male. It was located in the garden of Dr. Hall, resident at Yokohama, and sent to the nursery of Standish & Noble at Bagshot, Surrey. The firm's mother plant was fertilized and displayed, covered with red berries, at Kensington in 1864, creating a sensation that climaxed in 1891 with the statement from the Royal Horticultural Society's secretary, the Rev. W. Wilkes, "You can hardly have too much of it". A reaction to its ubiquitous presence set in after World War II.

== Cultivation ==
This plant is valued for its ability to thrive in the most difficult of garden environments, dry shade. It also copes with pollution and salt-laden coastal winds. It is often seen as an informal hedge, but may also be grown indoors as a houseplant. Today numerous cultivars are available from garden centres. The most popular cultivar is 'Variegata', with yellow spots on the leaves; this is a female clone, a similar male clone being named 'Maculata'. The following cultivars have gained the Royal Horticultural Society's Award of Garden Merit:

- 'Crotonifolia'
- 'Golden King'
- 'Rozannie' – A self-fertile variety not requiring a pollinator, produces deep red berries against solid green, glossy foliage.

Other cultivars include:-

- forma longifolia
- 'Mr. Goldstrike' – Male plant with leaves heavily speckled in yellow.
- 'Picturata' – Female plant with yellow foliage fringed with green.
- 'Petite Jade' – Variety with narrower leaves than other species, slender, and serrated. Solid green, growing to 6 ft. tall (can reach 10 ft. after 20 or more years).
- 'February Star' – Female plant with narrow leaves and sparse dots of variegation.

== Etymology ==
Japonica means 'from Japan'.

== Gallery ==
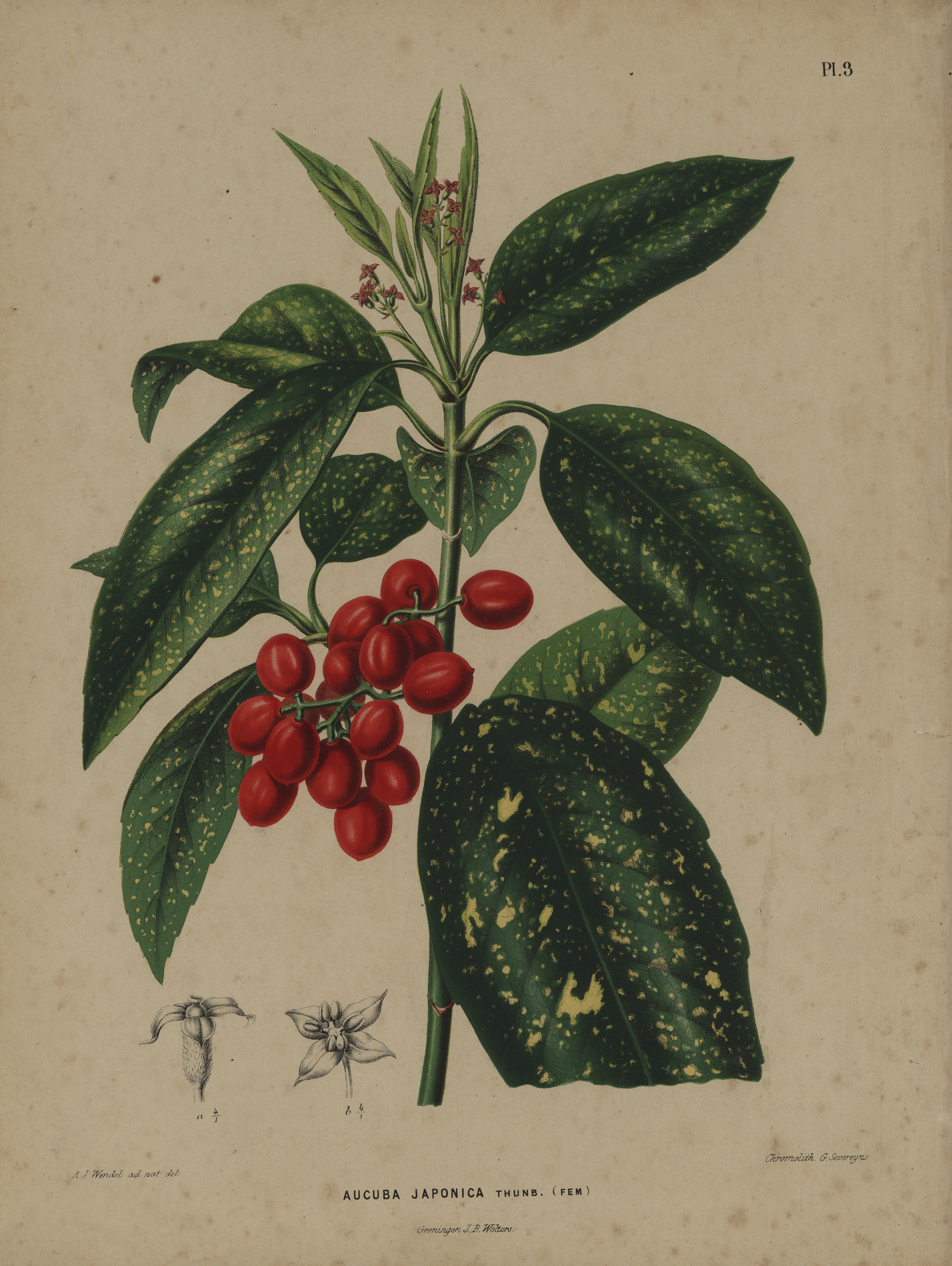
Painting by Dutch artist A.J. Wendel, 1868

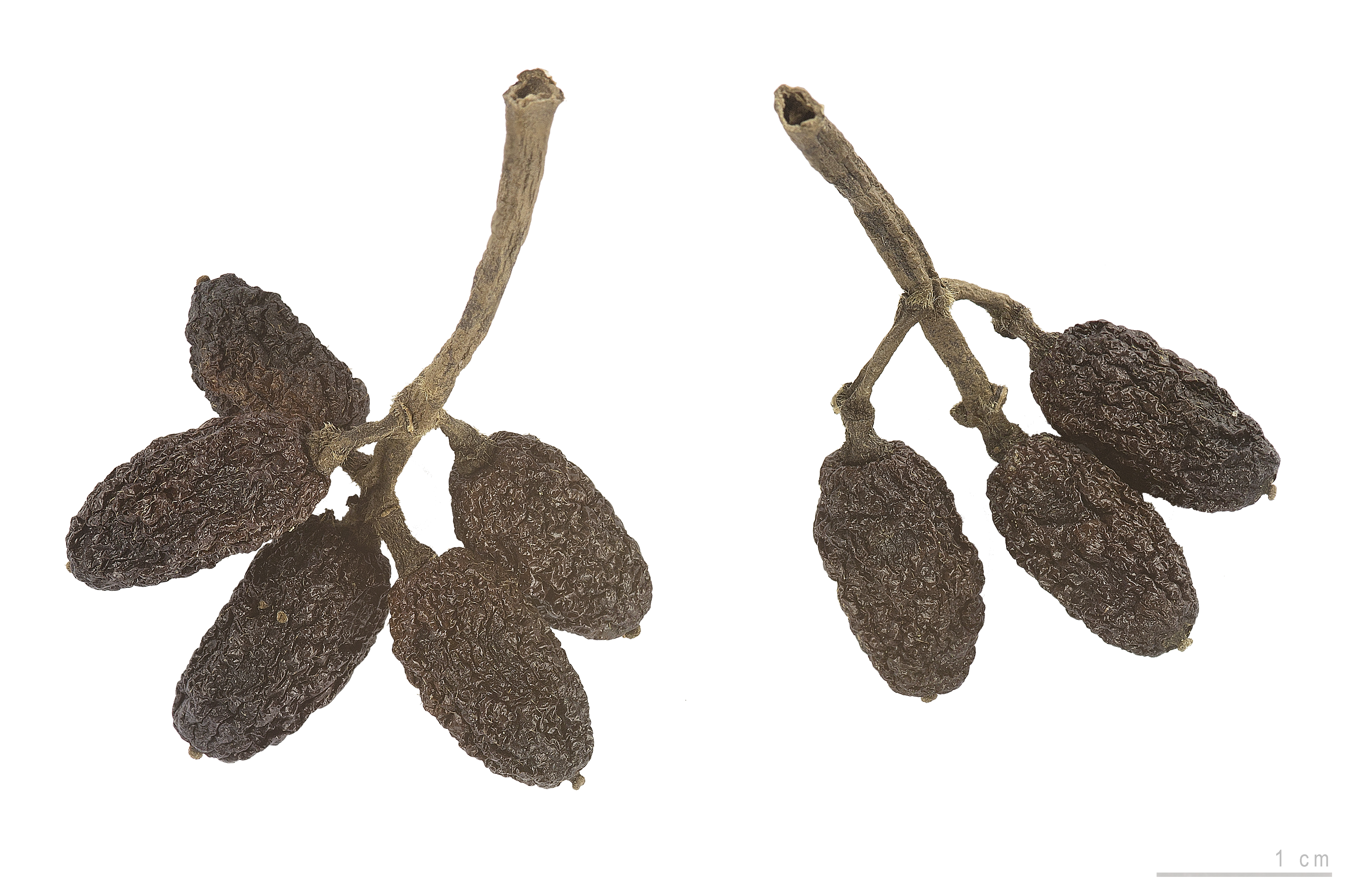
MHNT

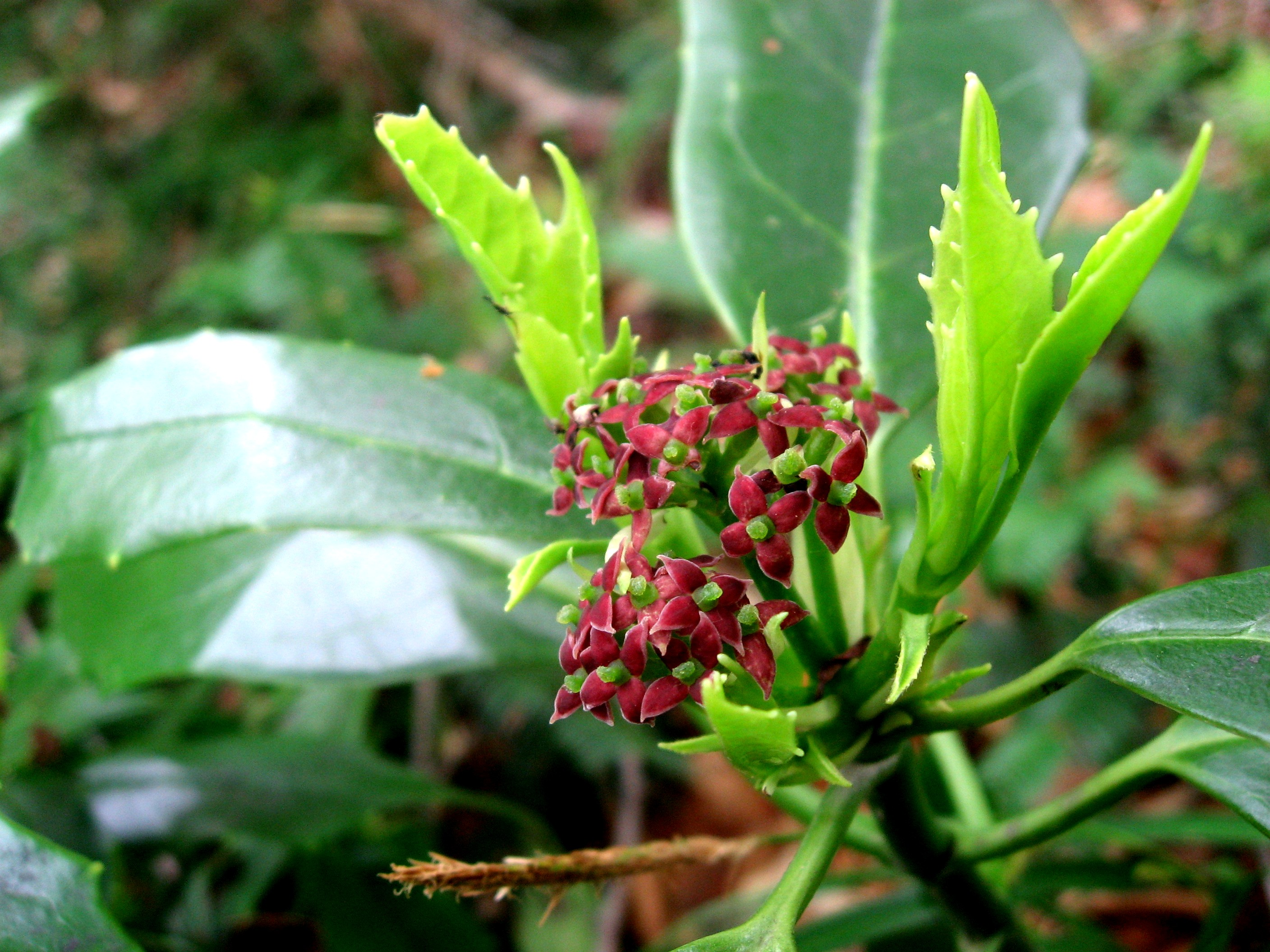
Flowers on female

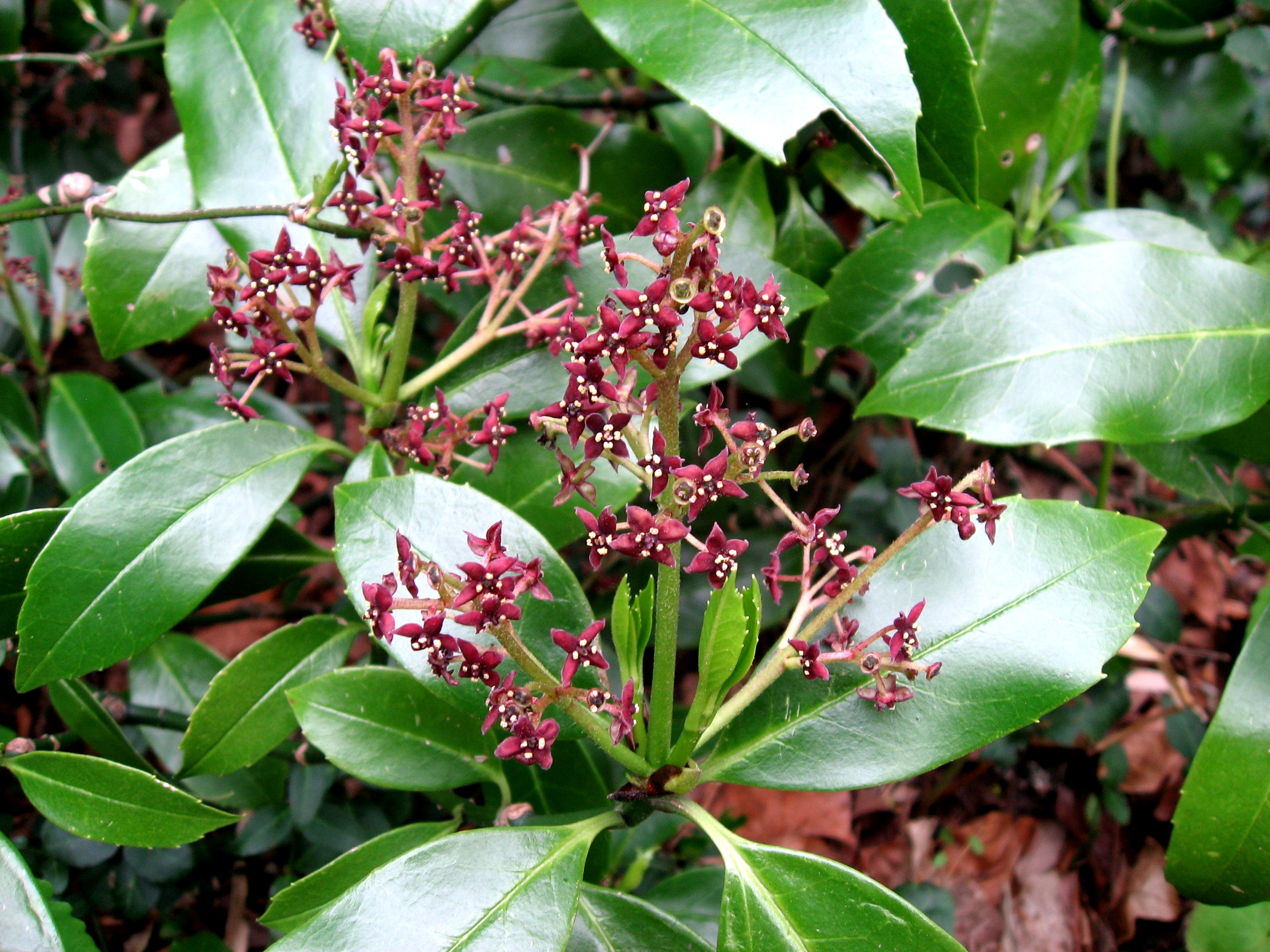
Flowers on male

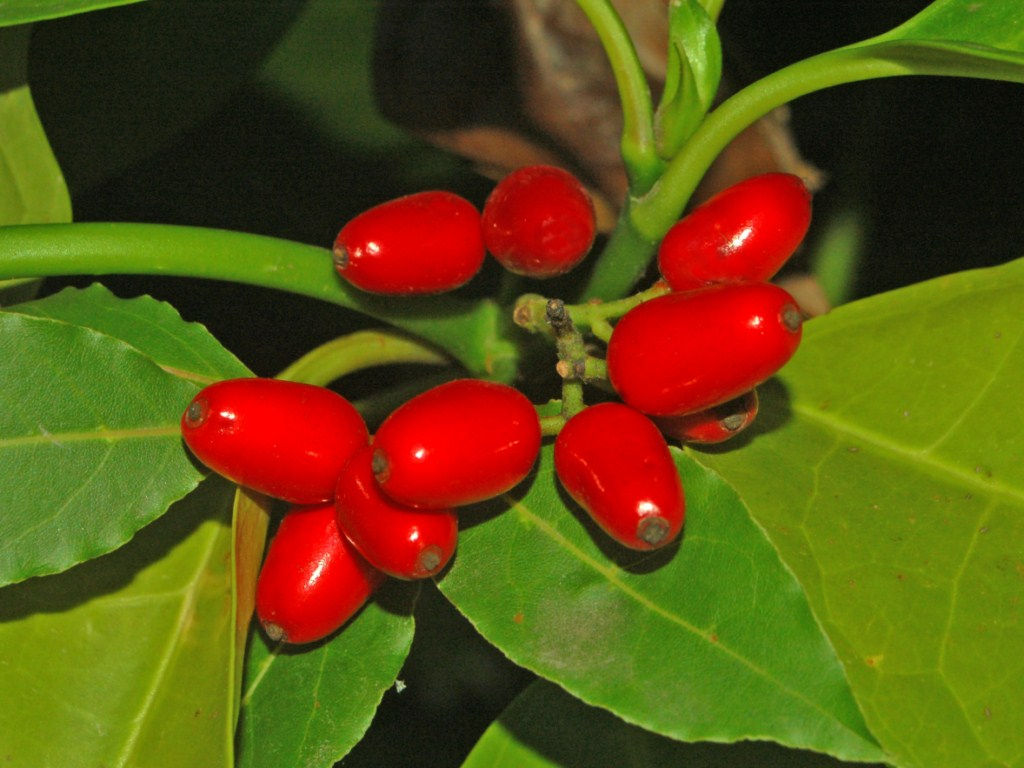
Fruits

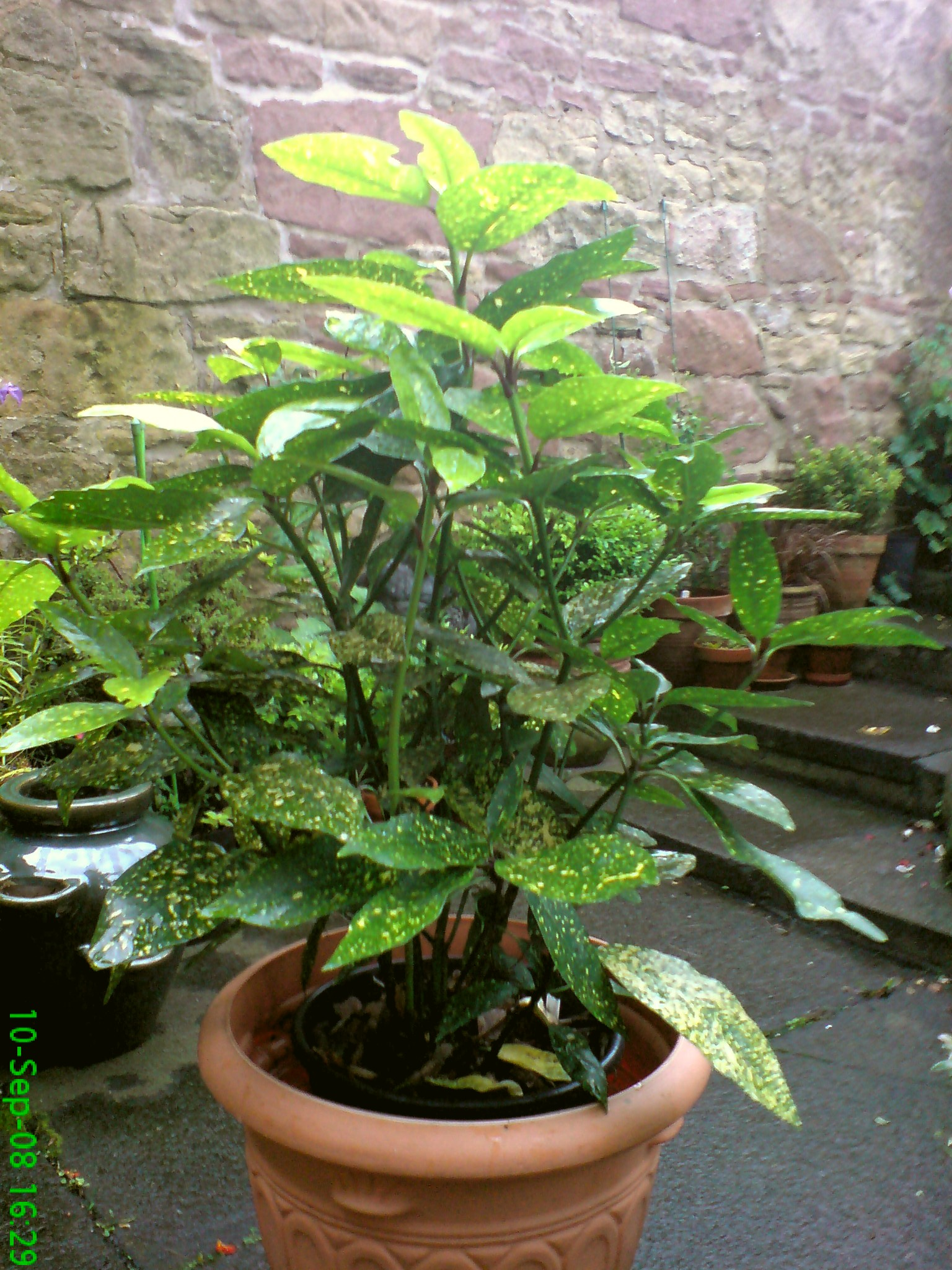
Male

Next to house
