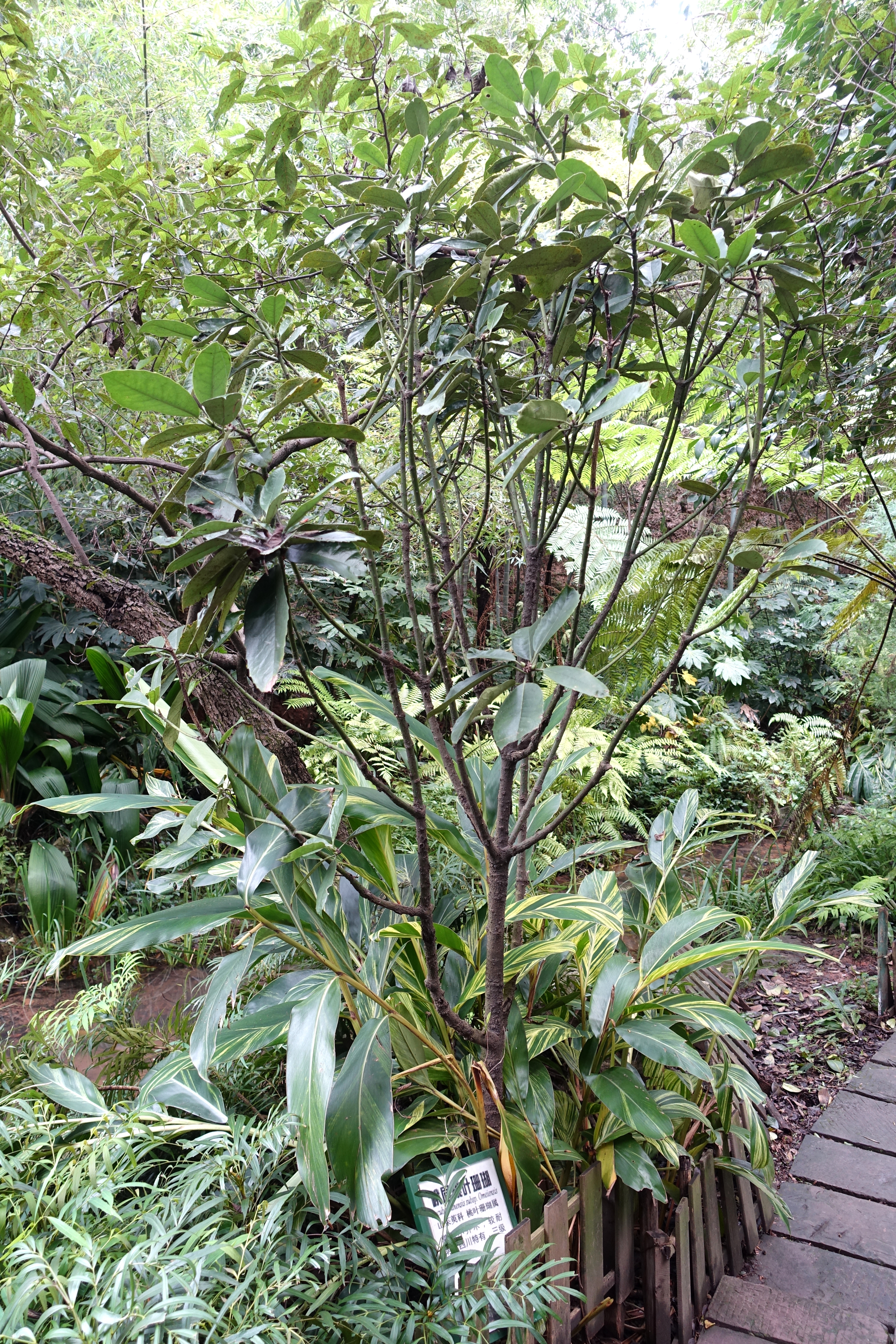

Conservation status
- Least Concern (IUCN 3.1)

Scientific classification
- Kingdom: Plantae
- Clade: Embryophytes
- Clade: Tracheophytes
- Clade: Angiosperms
- Clade: Eudicots
- Clade: Asterids
- Order: Garryales
- Family: Garryaceae
- Genus: Aucuba
- Species: A. chinensis

Binomial name
- Aucuba chinensis Benth.

Varieties
- Aucuba chinensis var. angusta F.T.Wang; Aucuba chinensis var. chinensis

Synonyms
- synonyms of var. angusta: Aucuba albopunctifolia var. angustifolia (Rehder) F.T.Wang; Aucuba chinensis f. angustifolia Rehder; Aucuba yunnanensis C.Y.Wu; Aucuba yunnanensis var. pubigera C.Y.Wu & S.Y.Pao; synonyms of var. chinensis: Aucuba chinensis subsp. omeiensis (W.P.Fang) W.P.Fang & Soong; Aucuba chinensis var. variegata Dombrain; Aucuba grandiflora C.Y.Wu; Aucuba omeiensis W.P.Fang

= Aucuba chinensis =

Species of plant

Aucuba chinensis is a shrub or small tree native to southern China, Taiwan, Myanmar, and northern Vietnam. Typically it grows to 6 meters tall, though it can be larger. The leaves are thick, dark green above and light green below, sometimes with teeth along the margins.

Two varieties are accepted:

- Aucuba chinensis var. angusta F.T.Wang – Taiwan and southern Zhejiang
- Aucuba chinensis var. chinensis – southern China, northern Vietnam, northern Myanmar, and central and southern Taiwan

The species was described by George Bentham in 1861.
