= Variegation =

Leaf with uneven distribution of chlorophyll

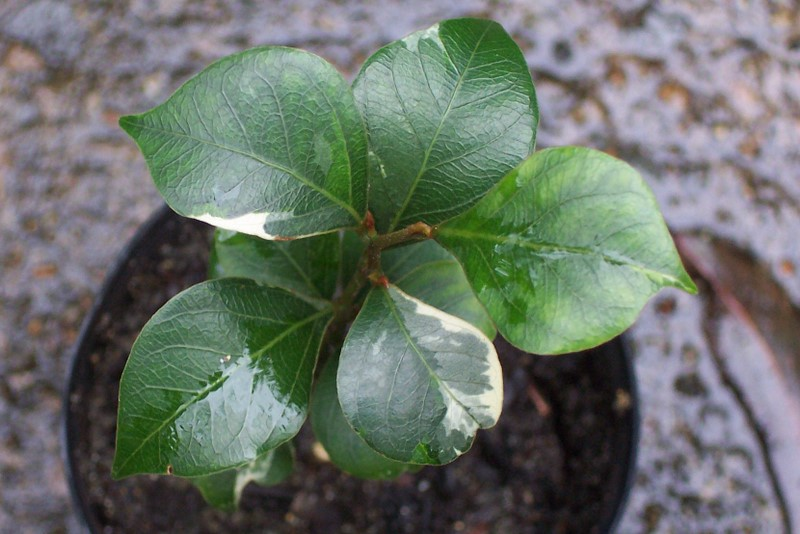
Cryptocarya williwilliana showing leaf venation and variegated leaves

Variegation is the appearance of differently coloured zones in the foliage, flowers, and sometimes the stems and fruit of plants, granting a speckled, striped, or patchy appearance. The colors of the patches themselves vary from a slightly lighter shade of the natural coloration to yellow, to white, or other colors entirely such as red and pink. This is caused by varying levels and types of pigment, such as chlorophyll in leaves. Variegation can be caused by genetic mutations affecting pigment production, or by viral infections such as those resulting from mosaic viruses. Many plants are also naturally variegated, such as Goeppertia insignis. Most of these are herbaceous or climbing plants, and are most often species native to tropical rainforests.

Many species which are normally non-variegated are known to display variegation. Their appearance is desirable to enthusiasts, and many such plants are propagated and sold as unique cultivars. However, in individuals where the variegation occurs in normally-photosynthetic cells, the lack of functioning chloroplasts can slow growth rate. Conversely, naturally-variegated plants derive benefits from their appearance, such as improved photosynthetic efficiency in low-light conditions and herbivore deterrence.

The term is also sometimes used to refer to colour zonation in minerals and the integument of animals.

== Causes ==
=== Chimeral ===
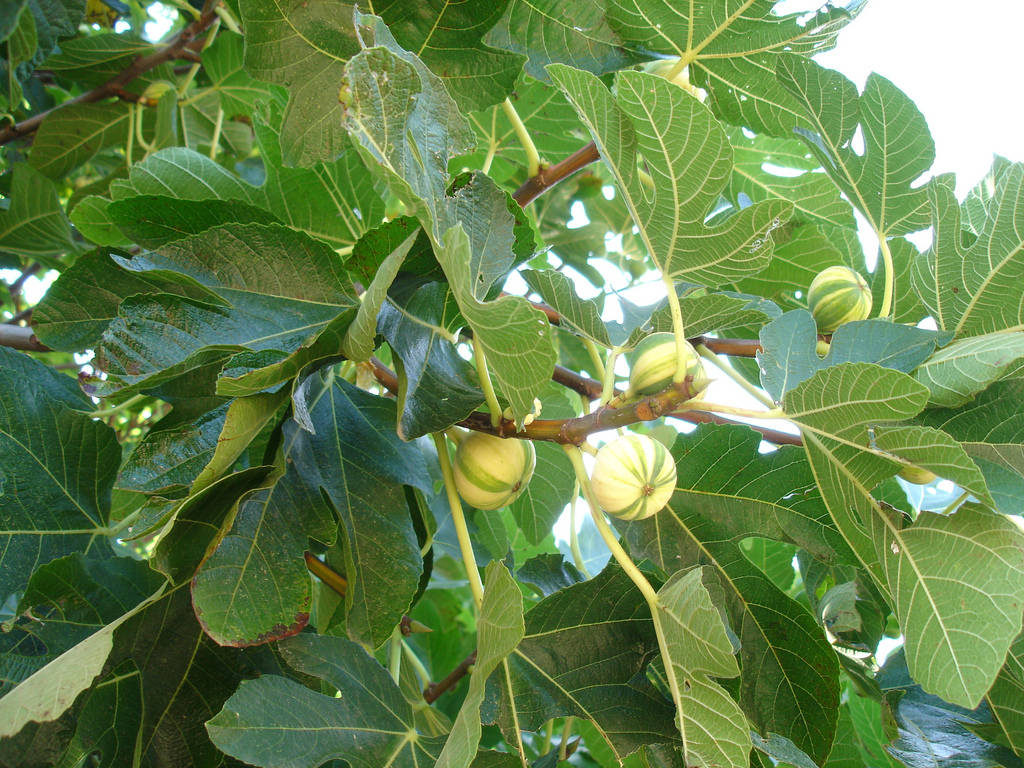
Variegation of fruits and wood in Ficus carica 'Panascè', a bicolor (yellow-green) common fig cultivar. This Italian cultivar is a chimera.

Chimeric plants contain tissues with more than one genotype. In the meristem, the active growing region of the plant, cells differentiate into layers. If the genomes of neighboring cellular layers express chlorophyll differently, variegation will result. A variegated chimera contains some tissues that produce chlorophyll and other tissues which do not. Because the variegation is due to the presence of two kinds of plant tissue, propagating the plant must be by a vegetative method of propagation that preserves both types of tissue in relation to each other. Typically, stem cuttings, bud and stem grafting and other similar propagation methods will be more likely to preserve stable variegation, but reversion is often a possibility, when the plant adapts to express chlorophyll in all tissues again. Cuttings with a complete lack of chlorophyll may be difficult, if not impossible, to propagate. If a plant is pruned to below the variegated area of its tissue, it is more likely to revert to the full-chlorophyll form.

=== Structural ===
Some variegation is caused by structural color, not pigment; the microscopic structure of the plant itself reflects light to produce varying colors. This can happen when an air layer is located just under the epidermis resulting in a white or silvery reflection. It is sometimes called blister variegation. Pilea cadierei (aluminum plant) shows this effect. Leaves of most Cyclamen species show such patterned variegation, varying between plants, but consistent within each plant.

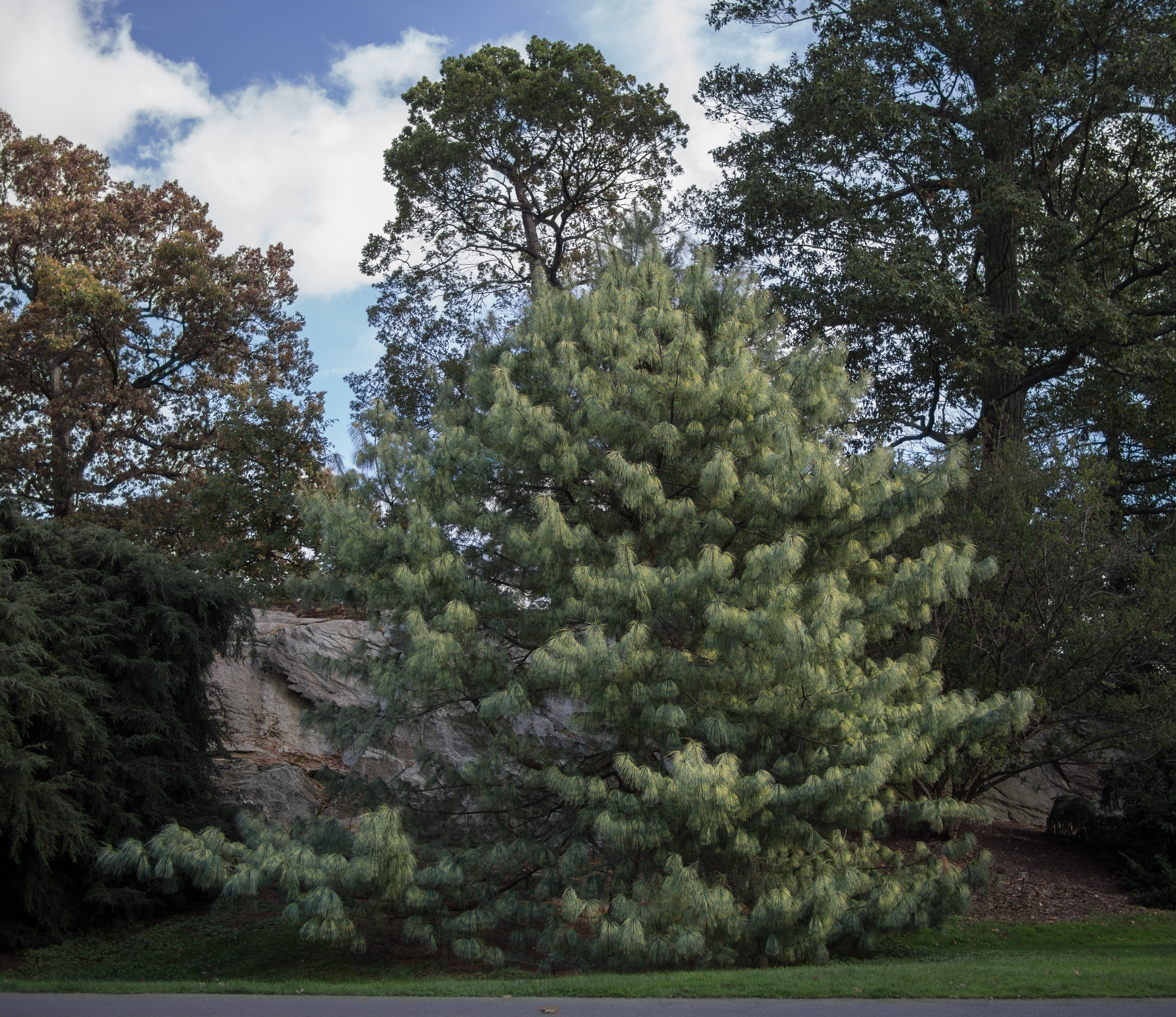
Variegated Himalayan pine (Pinus wallichiana) - a variegated gymnosperm

The presence of hairs on leaves, which may be coloured differently from the leaf itself, can also produce variable coloration. This is found in various Begonia species and their hybrids.

Sometimes venal variegation occurs – the veins of the leaf are picked out in white or yellow. This is due to lack of green tissue above the veins. It can be seen in some aroids. The blessed milk thistle, Silybum marianum, is a plant in which another type of venal variegation occurs, but in this case, it is due to a blister variegation occurring along the veins.

=== Pigmentary ===
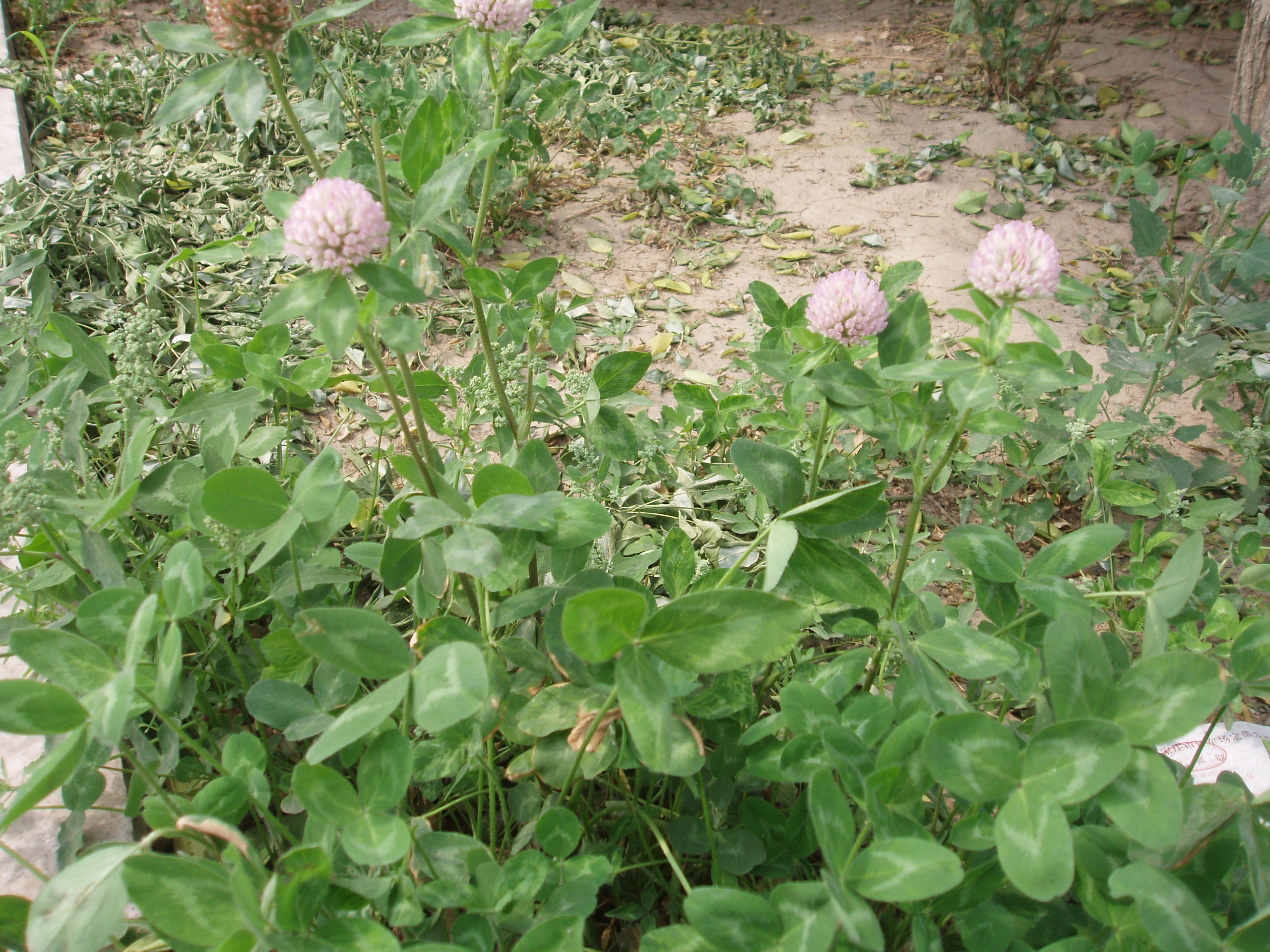
Leaves of red clover (Trifolium pratense) have a typical v-shaped variegation.

A common cause of variegation is the masking of green pigment by other pigments, such as anthocyanins. This often extends to the whole leaf, causing it to be reddish or purplish. On some plants however, consistent zonal markings occur; such as on some clovers, bromeliads, certain Pelargonium and Oxalis species. On others, such as the commonly grown forms of Coleus, the variegation can vary widely within a population. In Nymphaea lotus, the tiger lotus, leaf variegations appear under intense illumination.

=== Pathological ===
Virus infections may cause patterning to appear on the leaf surface. The patterning is often characteristic of the infection. Examples are the mosaic viruses, which produce a mosaic-type effect on the leaf surface or the citrus variegation virus (CVV). From 1996 onwards a virus disease, Hosta virus X (HVX) has been identified that causes mottled leaf coloring in hostas. At first, diseased plants were propagated and grown for their mottled foliage, at the risk of infecting other healthy hostas. While these diseases are usually serious enough that the gardener would not grow affected plants, there are a few affected plants that can survive indefinitely, and are attractive enough to be grown for ornament such as some variegated Abutilon varieties.

Plant nutrition deficiency symptoms may cause a temporary or variable yellowing in specific zones on the leaf. Iron and magnesium deficiencies are common causes of this.

Transposable elements can cause colour variegation.

=== Defensive masquerade ===
It has been suggested that some patterns of leaf variegation may be part of a "defensive masquerade strategy." In this, leaf variegation may appear to a leaf mining insect that the leaf is already infested, and this may reduce parasitization of the leaf by leaf miners.

== Nomenclature ==
By convention, the italicised term 'variegata' as the second part of the Latin binomial name, indicates a species found in the wild with variegation (Aloe variegata). The much more common, non-italicised, inclusion of 'Variegata' as the third element of a name indicates a variegated cultivar of an unvariegated parent (Aucuba japonica 'Variegata'). However, not all variegated plants have this Latin tag, for instance many cultivars of Pelargonium have some zonal variegation in their leaves. Other types of variegation may be indicated, e.g. Daphne odora 'Aureomarginata' has yellow edging on its leaves.

== Usage ==
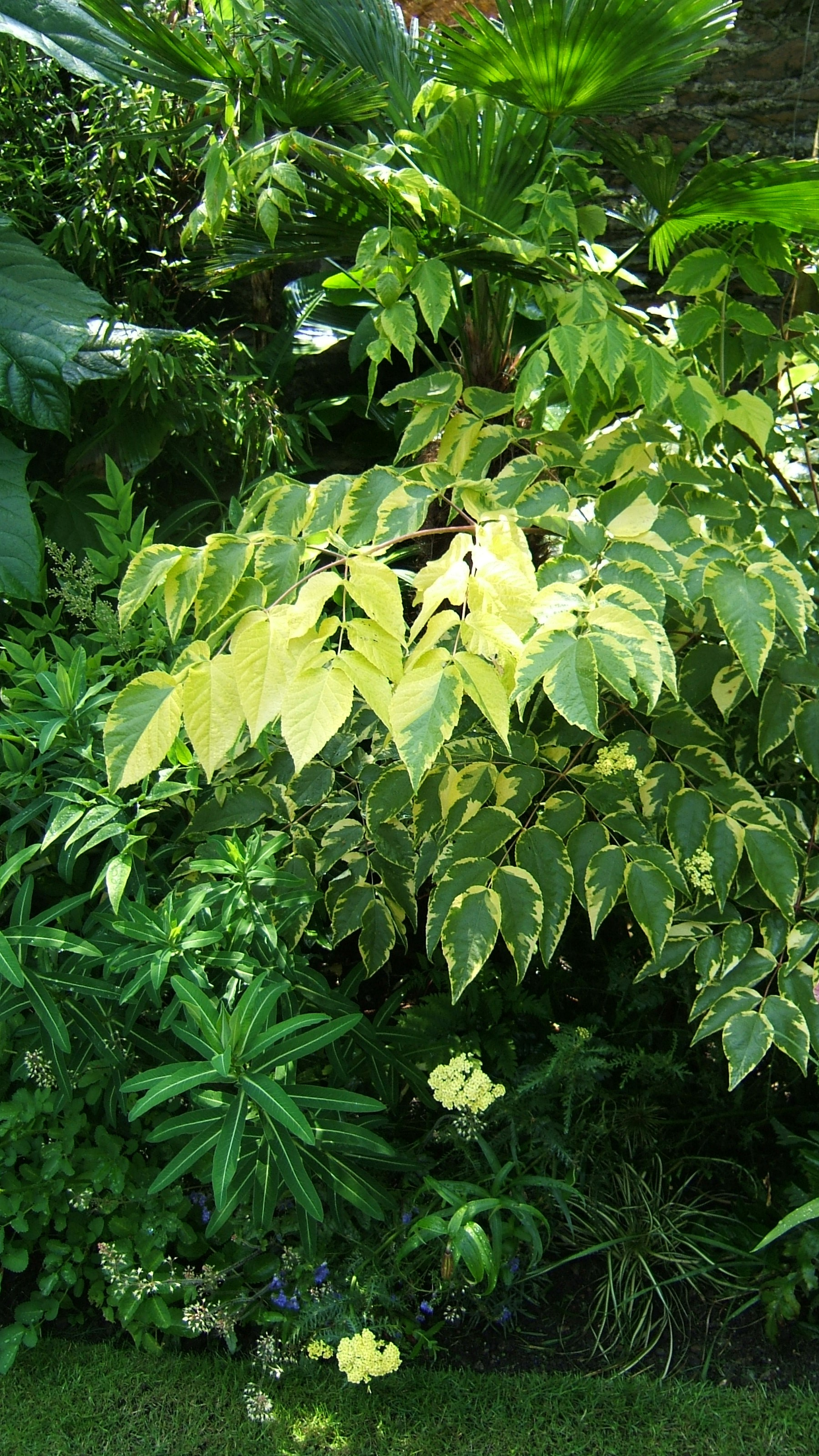
Variegated foliage used in an English garden. Plants shown include Aralia elata 'Aureovariegata' and Carex ornithopoda 'Variegata'

Variegated plants have long been valued by gardeners, as the usually lighter-coloured variegation can give texture or variety to what would otherwise be blocks of solid green foliage. Many gardening societies have specialist variegated plants groups, such as the Hardy Plant Society's Variegated Plant Special Interest Group in the UK.

In 2020, a variegated Rhaphidophora tetrasperma plant sold at auction for US$5,300. In June 2021, another variegated Rhaphidophora tetrasperma plant sold at auction for US$19,297.

== See also ==
- Glossary of botanical terms
