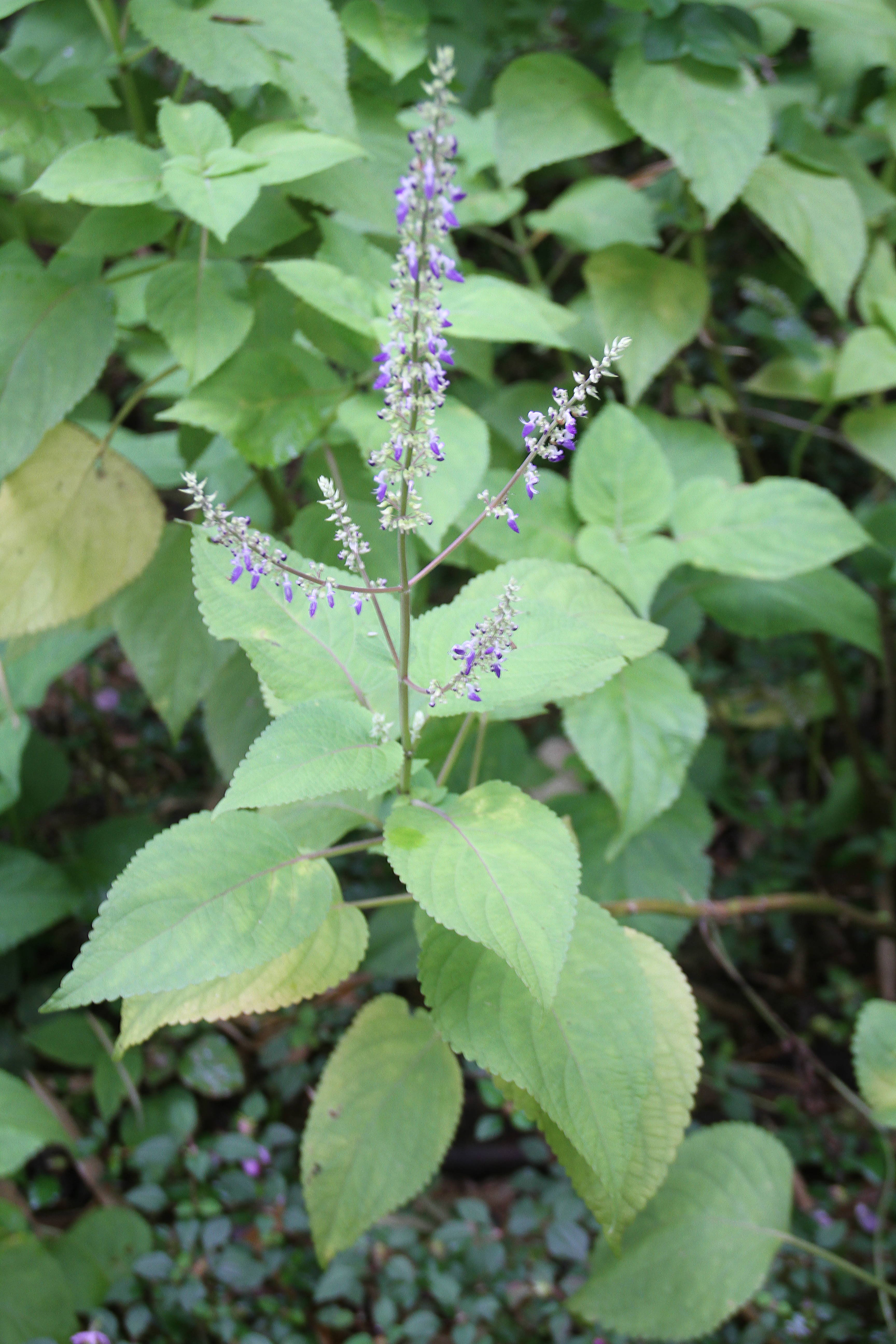
- A coleus naturalized in Puerto Rico
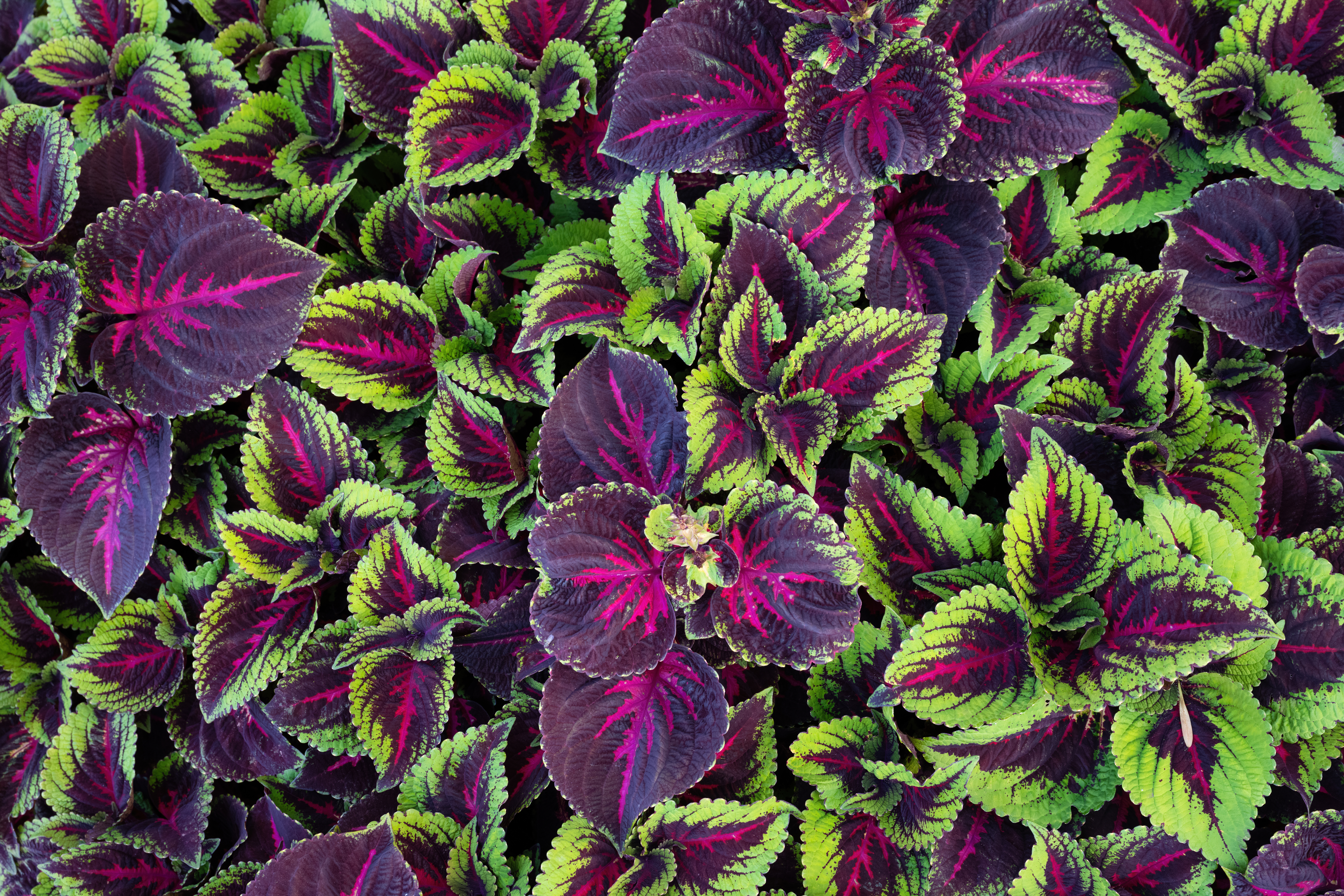
- Two cultivars

Scientific classification
- Kingdom: Plantae
- Clade: Embryophytes
- Clade: Tracheophytes
- Clade: Angiosperms
- Clade: Eudicots
- Clade: Asterids
- Order: Lamiales
- Family: Lamiaceae
- Genus: Coleus
- Species: C. scutellarioides

Binomial name
- Coleus scutellarioides (L.) Benth.

Synonyms
- Calchas acuminatus (Benth.) P.V.Heath; Calchas atropurpureus (Benth.) P.V.Heath; Calchas crispipilus (Merr.) P.V.Heath; Calchas scutellarioides (L.) P.V.Heath; Coleus acuminatus Benth.; Coleus atropurpureus Benth.; Coleus berkeleyi T.Moore; Coleus blancoi Benth.; Coleus blumei Benth.; Coleus crispipilus (Merr.) Merr.; Coleus dixii T.Moore; Coleus formosanus Hayata; Coleus gaudichaudii Briq.; Coleus gibbsiae S.Moore; Coleus gibsonii J.J.Veitch; Coleus grandifolius Blanco; Coleus grandifolius Benth.; Coleus hybridus Cobeau; Coleus igolotorum Briq.; Coleus ingratus (Blume) Benth.; Coleus integrifolius Elmer; Coleus laciniatus (Blume) Benth.; Coleus marshallii T.Moore; Coleus multiflorus Benth.; Coleus pubescens Merr.; Coleus pumilus Blanco; Coleus rehneltianus A.Berger; Coleus ruckeri T.Moore; Coleus saundersii T.Moore; Coleus savannicola K.Schum.; Coleus scutellarioides var. angustifolius Benth.; Coleus scutellarioides var. laxus Benth.; Coleus scutellarioides var. limnophilus Benth.; Coleus secundiflorus Benth.; Coleus veitchii Dombrain; Coleus verschaffeltii Lem.; Coleus zschokkei Merr.; Germanea nudiflora Poir.; Majana acuminata (Benth.) Kuntze; Majana blancoi (Benth.) Kuntze; Majana grandifolia (Benth.) Kuntze; Majana multiflora (Benth.) Kuntze; Majana pumila (Blanco) Kuntze; Majana scutellariodes (L.) Kuntze; Majana secundiflora (Benth.) Kuntze; Ocimum peltatum Schweigg. ex Schrank; Ocimum scutellarioides L.; Perilla nankinensis Wender.; Plectranthus aromaticus Roxb.; Plectranthus blumei (Benth.) Launert; Plectranthus ingratus Blume; Plectranthus laciniatus Blume; Plectranthus nudiflorus (Poir.) Willd.; Plectranthus scutellarioides Blume; Plectranthus scutellarioides (L.) R.Br.; Solenostemon blumei (Benth.) M.Gómez; Solenostemon scutellarioides (L.) Codd

= Coleus scutellarioides =

Species of flowering plant

Coleus scutellarioides, commonly known as coleus, is a species of flowering plant in the family Lamiaceae (the mint or deadnettle family), native to southeast Asia through to Australia. Typically growing to 60–75 cm (24–30 in) tall and wide, it is a bushy, woody-based evergreen perennial, widely grown for the highly decorative variegated leaves found in cultivated varieties.

Another common name is painted nettle, reflecting its relationship to deadnettles (the Lamium species), which are in the same family. (True nettles and their close kin are in the distant family Urticaceae.) The synonyms Coleus blumei, Plectranthus scutellarioides and Solenostemon scutellarioides are also widely used for this species.

== Description ==
Coleus scutellarioides is an upright annual or short-lived perennial plant which can live for about three or four years. Although certain forms (such as the cultivar 'Lime Time') may grow as tall as 1 m (3 ft), with well-branched, (generally) four-angled stems, most Coleus stay less than 60 cm (2 ft). Shorter, more trailing forms have sometimes been described as separate species (under names such as Coleus pumilus or Solenostemon pumilus), but are all now considered part of the very variable C. scutellarioides.

With modern cultivation and hybridisation, the species has become extremely variable with regards to its leaf colour, patterning and shape. They have somewhat fleshy, semi-succulent, but tender leaves, varying in size from 1.5–10 cm (0.6–3.9 in) long by 1–6 cm (0.4–2.4 in) wide; usually ovate in shape, the leaves are borne on petioles (stalks) from 0.5–5 cm (0.2–2.0 in) long. The leaf margin is divided to a variable degree. Hairs are present on both sides of the leaf.

=== Inflorescence ===
The inflorescence is borne on the end of a stem and, like the leaves, is very variable in size; it may be up to 4 cm (1.6 in) long, with few or many flowers. The calyx is bell-shaped, initially only 1–2 mm (0.04–0.08 in) long, but lengthening to 5–7 mm (0.2–0.3 in) when in fruit. The bluish-purple petals are joined to form a typical two-lipped labiate flower, 8–10 mm (0.3–0.4 in) long. The stamens are joined for about half their length and are covered by the upper lip of the flower. The fruit is described as a "nutlet", and is black, about 1 mm (0.04 in) long.

=== Pigmentation ===
The leaves of the wild species may be somewhat variegated, but this has been developed to an extreme degree in cultivated varieties, whose leaves may include one or more shades of green, white, cream, yellow, pink, red, maroon and dark purple. Green coloration is due to the amount of chlorophyll present in the chloroplasts in the leaves. Red, purple, pink, and orange colors are due to anthocyanins – water-soluble, flavonoid biosynthetic pigments, found in the foliage in addition to chlorophyll. The increase in anthocyanin production is accompanied by a decrease in chlorophyll production.

The production of anthocyanins and chlorophyll is affected by light levels; the more light is present, the more anthocyanins are produced, with an inverse relationship to the production of chlorophyll. Anthocyanins are created inside the cell and facilitate photosynthesis in leaves that are exposed to very intense or prolonged sunlight by providing protection from damage caused by ultraviolet light. Some coleus cultivars over-produce anthocyanins and under-produce chlorophyll to the extent that optimal growth is prevented.

== Taxonomy ==
The species was first described by Carl Linnaeus in 1763, as Ocimum scutellarioides. The genus Ocimum is best known for Ocimum basilicum, sweet basil. The specific epithet scutellarioides (with the suffix -oides) means "Scutellaria-like". Scutellaria is a genus also in the Lamiaceae; its name is derived from the Latin scutella, meaning a small dish or bowl.

Genera and species related to Ocimum, placed in the tribe Ocimeae, have been the subject of considerable taxonomic confusion, and C. scutellarioides has been placed in several genera and been given multiple synonyms. Robert Brown transferred O. scutellarioides to the genus Plectranthus in 1810. George Bentham transferred it to the genus Coleus as Coleus scutellarioides in 1830, and in 1832 also described Coleus blumei, now regarded as just a variant of this species. Placement in the genus Coleus led to the name "coleus", still widely used by horticulturalists and gardeners, and now treated as a common name for this species. It was transferred to Solenostemon by Leslie E. W. Codd in 1975.

A major phylogenetic study of the subtribe Plectranthinae in 2018 showed that the genus Plectranthus, as then circumscribed, was not monophyletic, and the authors proposed re-instating Coleus, then wholly submerged in Plectranthus. A summary cladogram for the subtribe Plectranthinae, based on the 2018 study, was published in 2019, along with names in Coleus for all the species recognized in that genus. In the version of the cladogram below, the three genera that formed part of Plectranthus s.l. are highlighted.

- Tribe Ocimeae
  - Subtribe Ociminae
  - - Subtribe Plectranthinae
      - - Alvesia (3 spp.)
        - - Aeollanthus (42 spp.)
          - - - Tetradenia + Thorncroftia (29 spp.)
              - Plectranthus (72 spp.)
            - Capitanopsis (6 spp.)
            - Equilabium (42 spp.)
      - Coleus (294 spp., including Coleus scutellarioides)

== Distribution and habitat ==
Coleus scutellarioides is native from southeast Asia through to Australia (the Bismarck Archipelago, Borneo, Cambodia, Southeast China, Java, Laos, the Lesser Sunda Islands, Peninsular Malaysia, Maluku, Myanmar, Nansei-shoto, New Guinea, Northern Territory, Philippines, Queensland, the Solomon Islands, Sulawesi, Sumatra, Taiwan, Thailand, Vietnam, and Western Australia).

It is cultivated worldwide and may be naturalized in other tropical regions. In its native habitat, it is found at elevations of 100–1,600 m (330–5,250 ft), where it flowers and fruits throughout the year. It is winter hardy to USDA Zones 10–11.

== Cultivation ==
=== History ===
The species was first introduced into Europe from Java in 1851 by a Dutch horticulturalist. At this time, there were few leaf colors and shapes. A wider variety was available by 1877, when the American William Bull offered seeds at 43 US cents each. However, by selecting for seed production, early flowering was inadvertently favored, and leaf color also declined in intensity. Coleus breeding revived in the early 1940s, and by the 1980s, the availability of an improved range of cultivars led to coleus becoming the tenth most important bedding crop in the US. More recently, vegetative propagation has enabled cultivars with novel leaf colors and shapes to be offered for sale. Plants with trailing as well as upright habits are now available.

=== Cultivars ===
The leaves of coleus cultivars vary in color, from pale yellow to dark purple; in variegation, from almost one color to many colours; in patterning, from symmetrical to irregular; and in shape, from broad to narrow and from small-toothed to wavy margins.

The leaves of cultivars typically show sharp contrasts between their colors; particular leaves may be several shades of green, pink, yellow, "black" (a very dark purple), maroon, cream, white, and red (somewhat resembling the unrelated Caladium). The leaf shape also varies from broadly ovate to more narrowly lanceolate. The leaf margins may have small or large teeth or be wavy, as may the whole leaf. New cultivars with different leaf shapes and color combinations are constantly being created.

Variation in leaf color and shape in cultivars

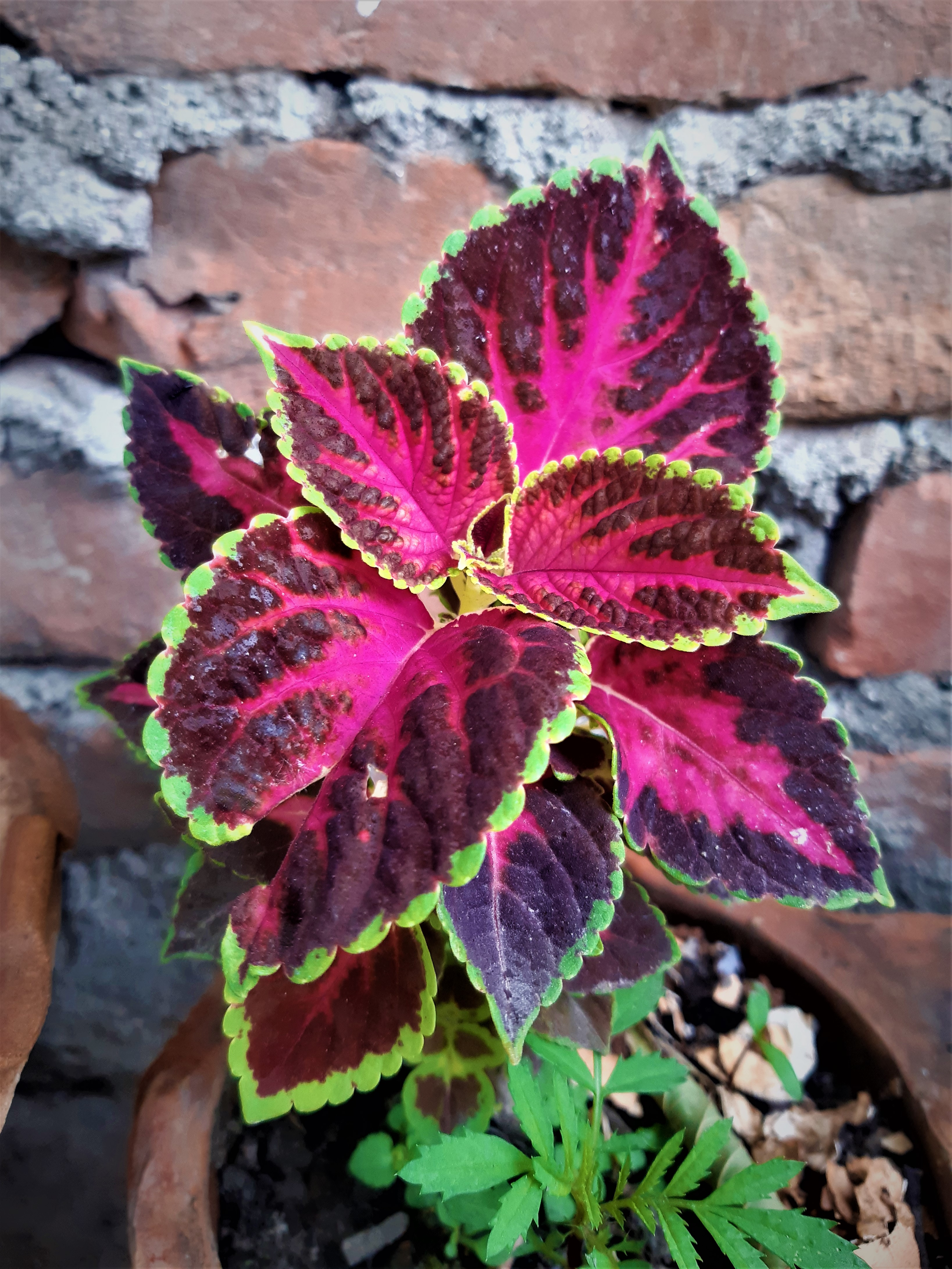

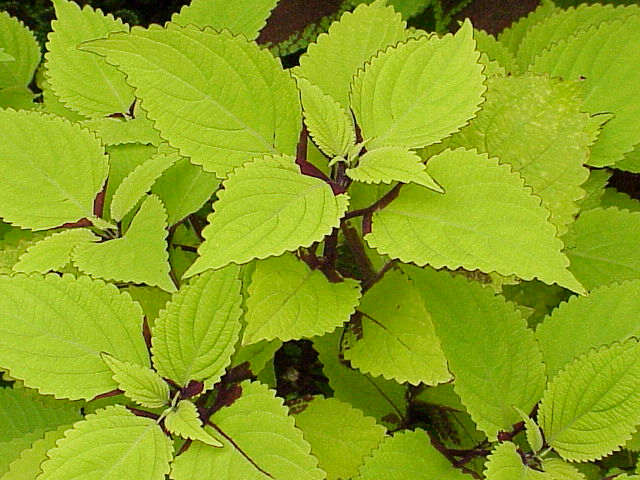

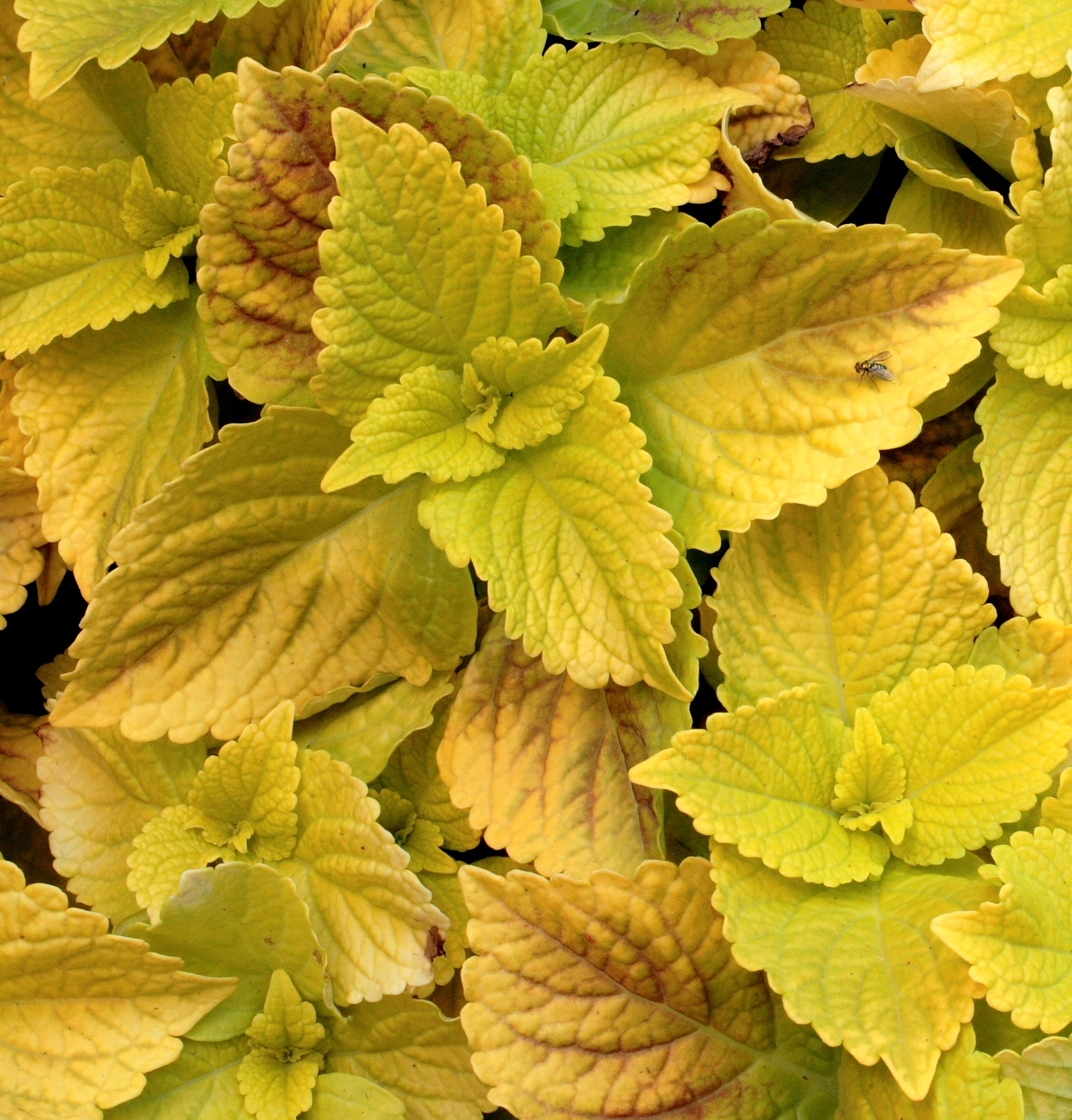

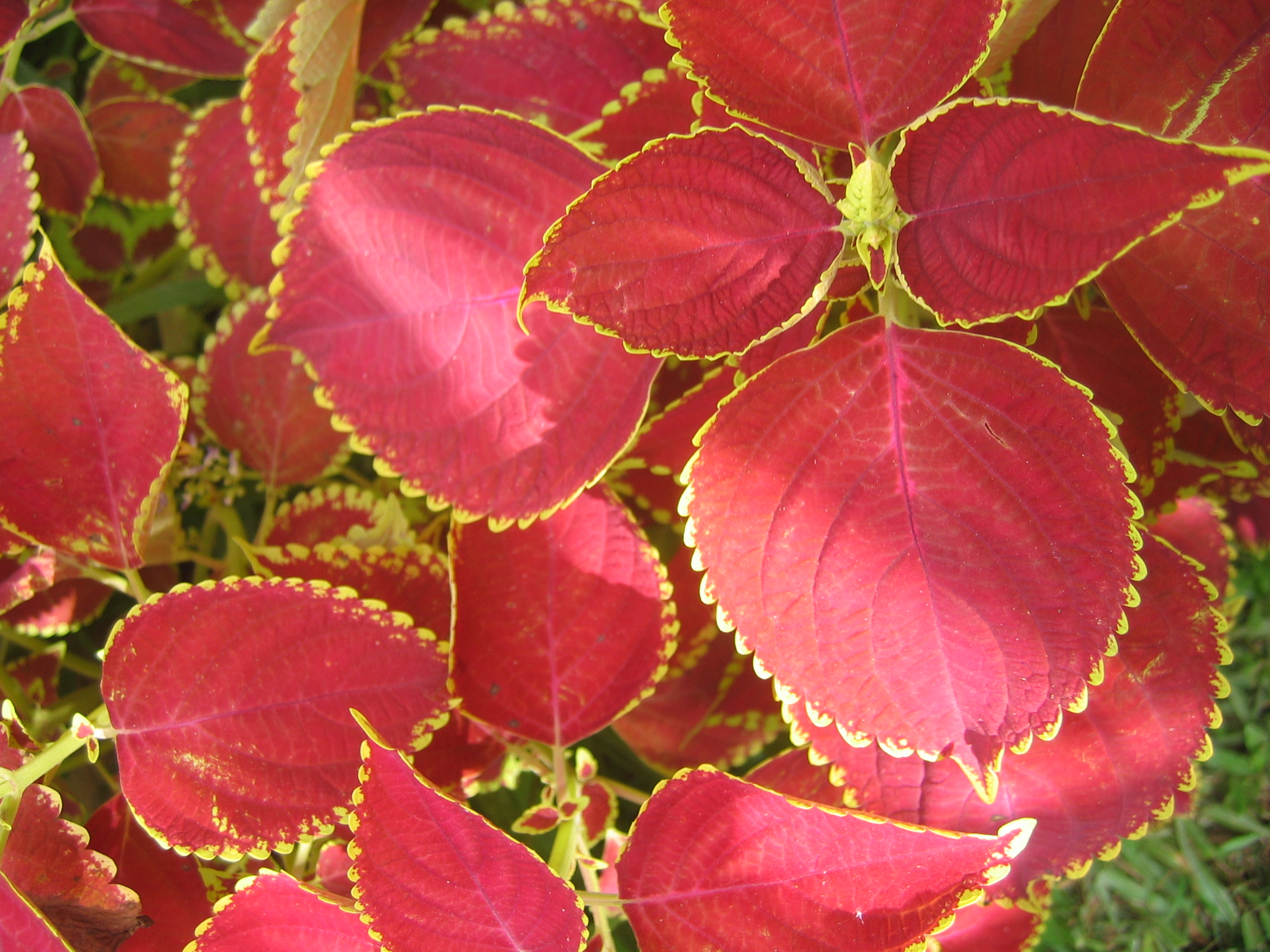

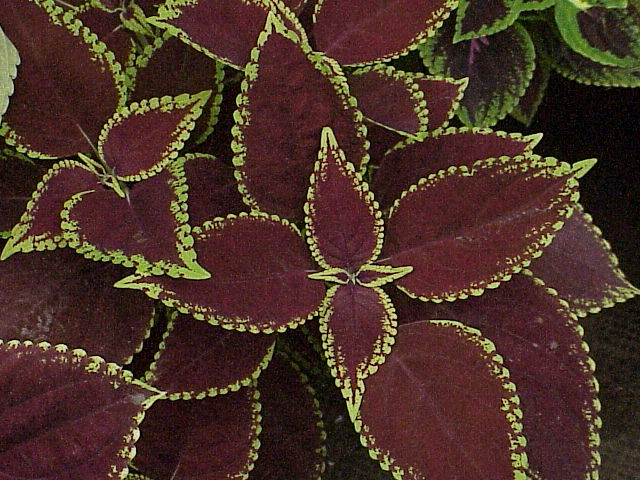

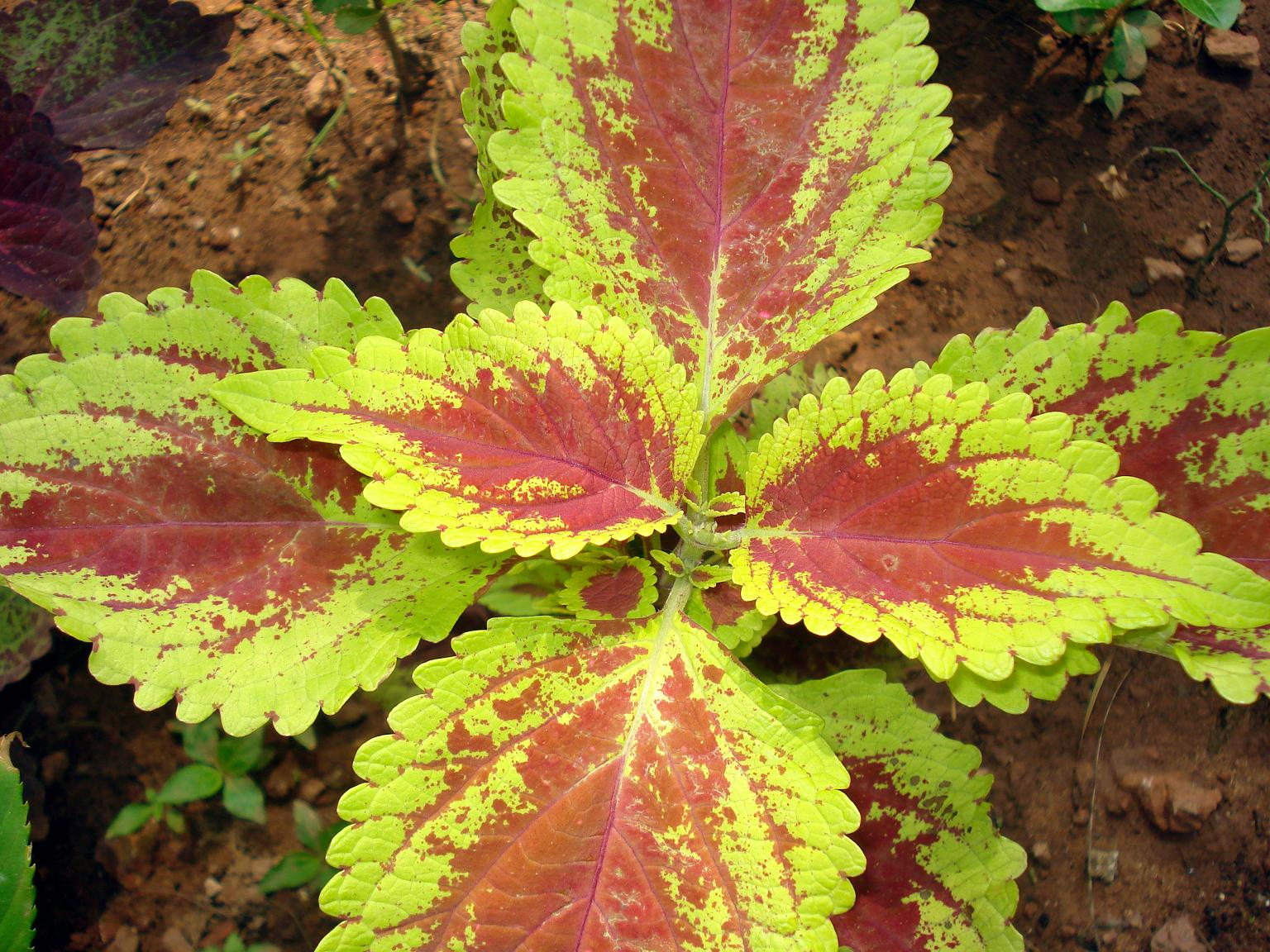

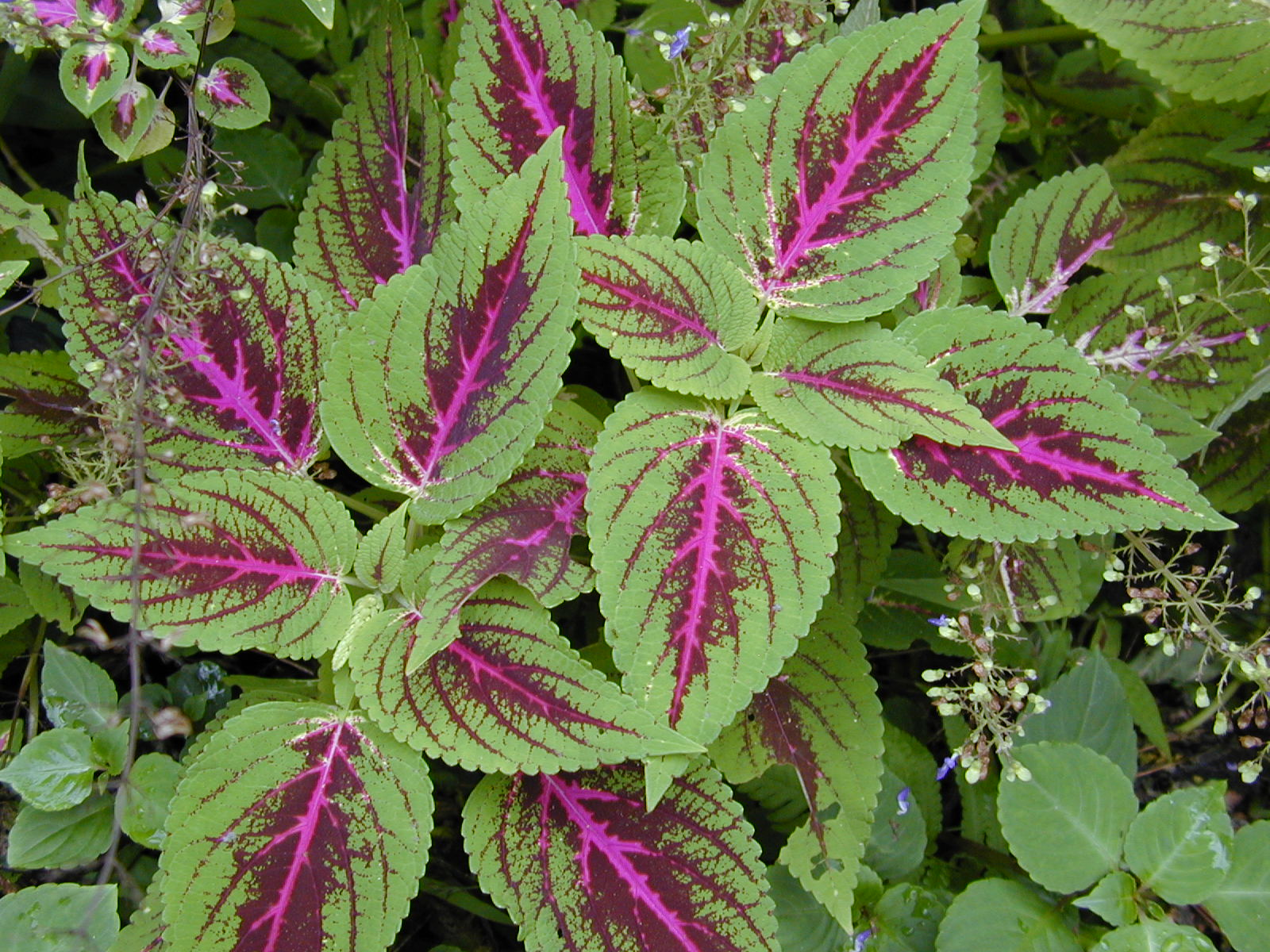

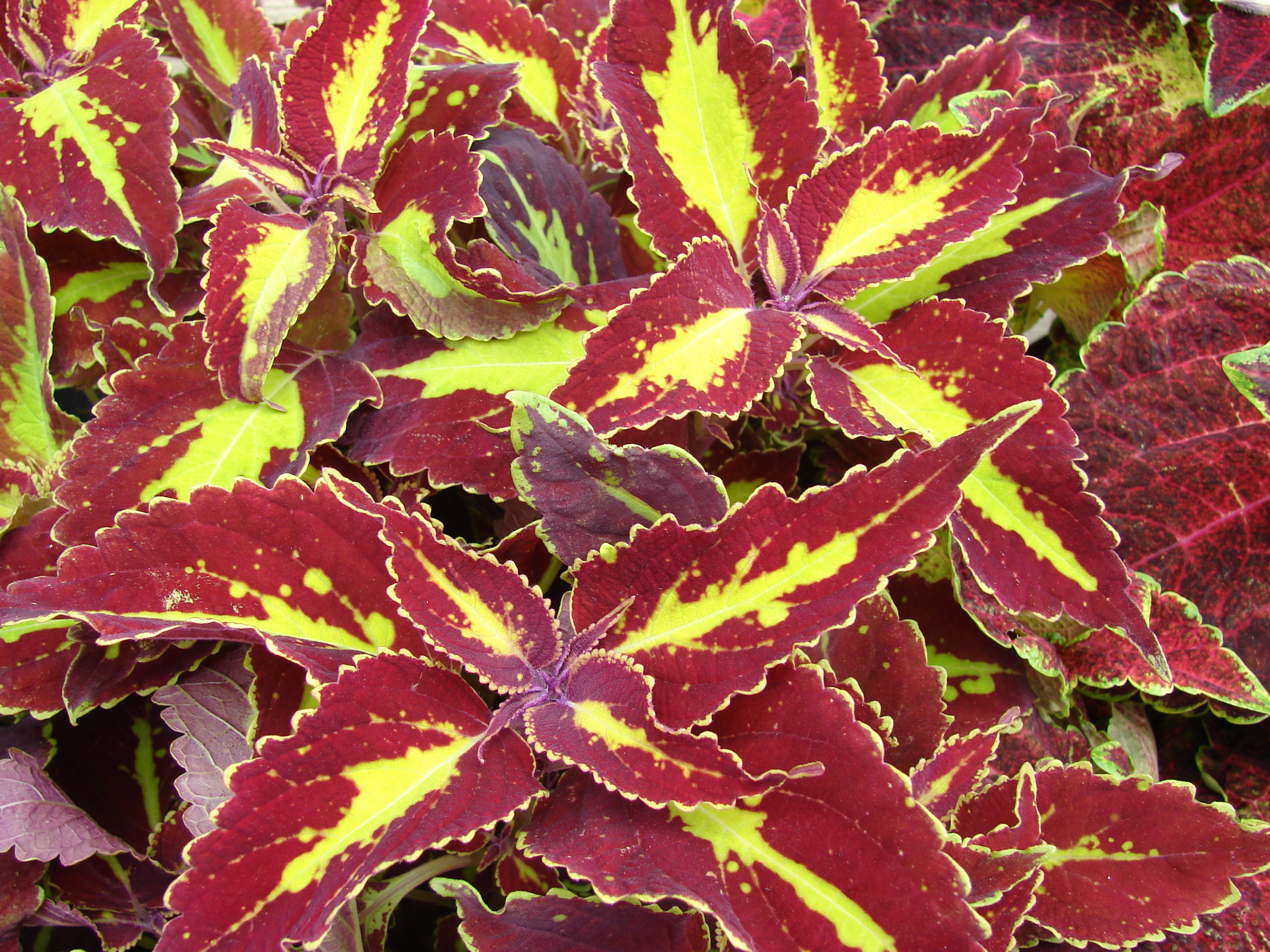

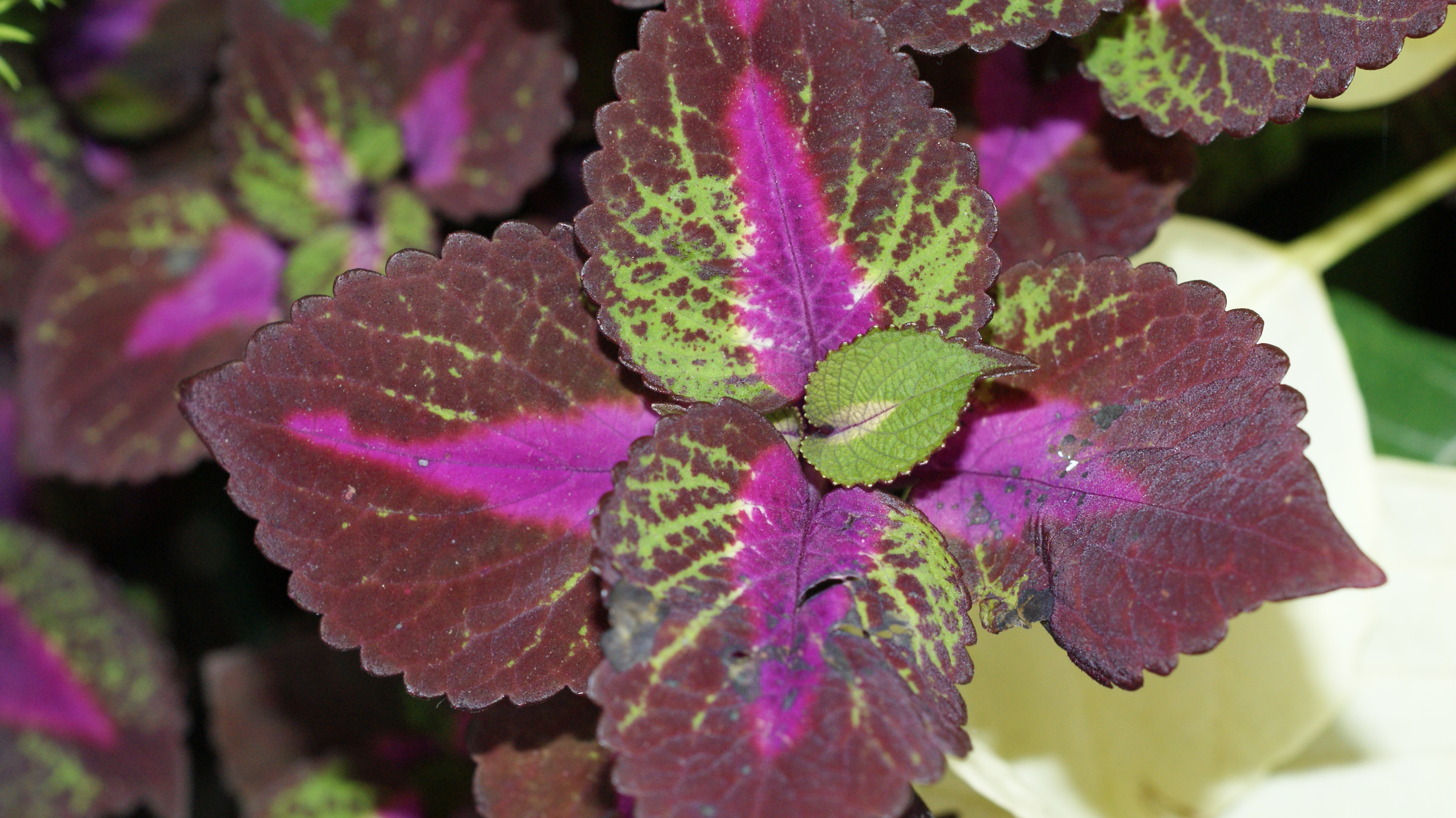

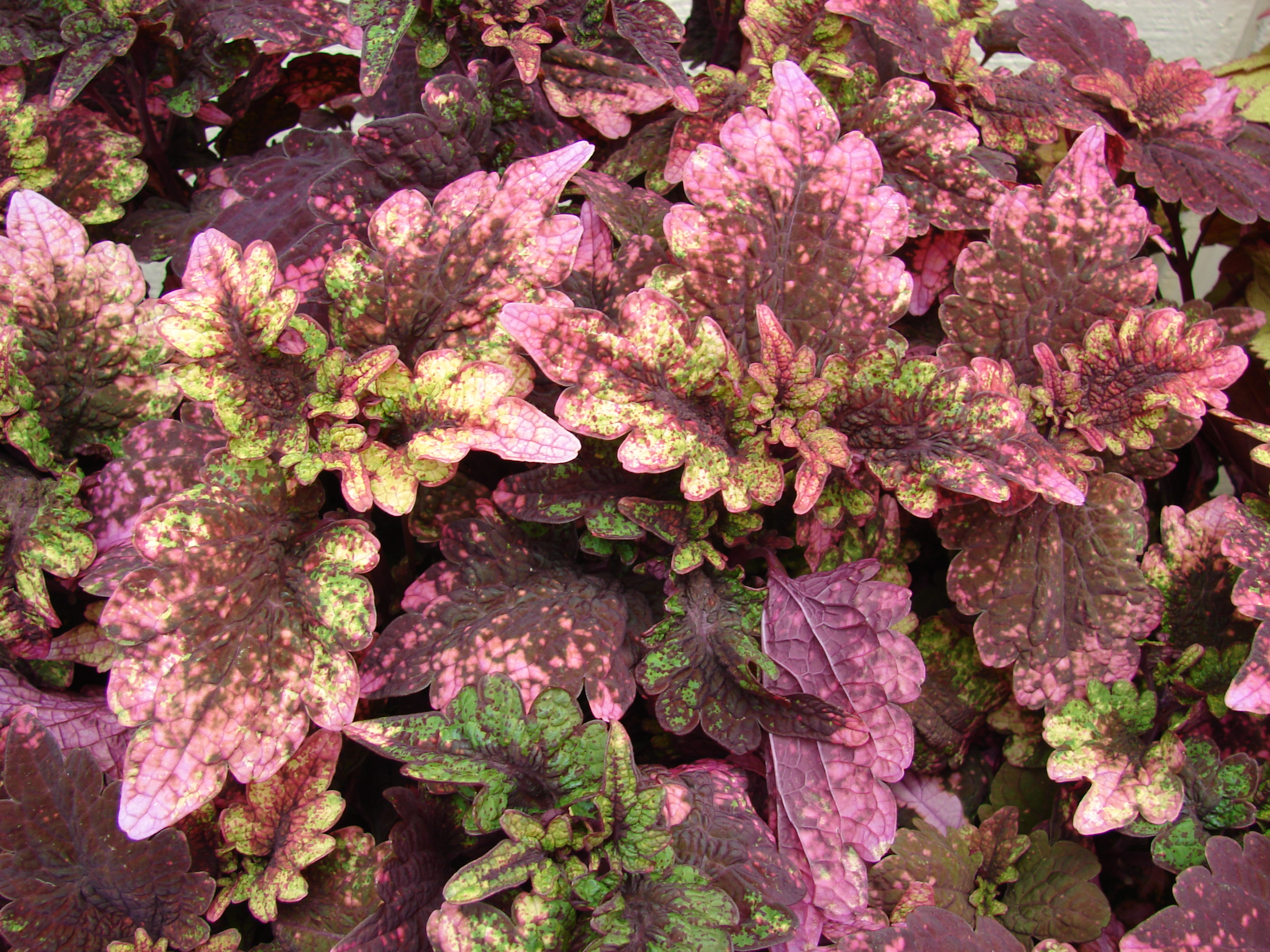

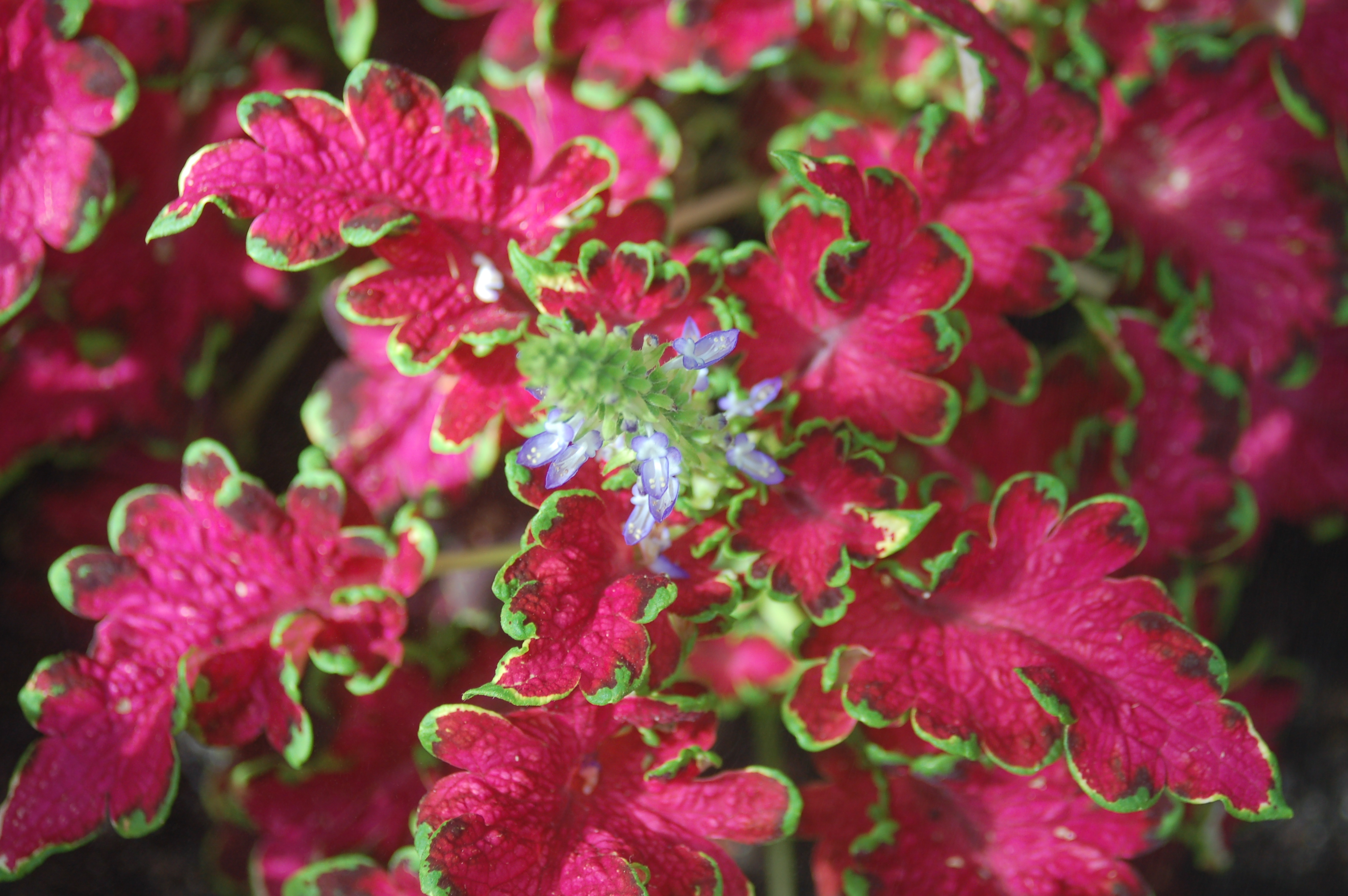

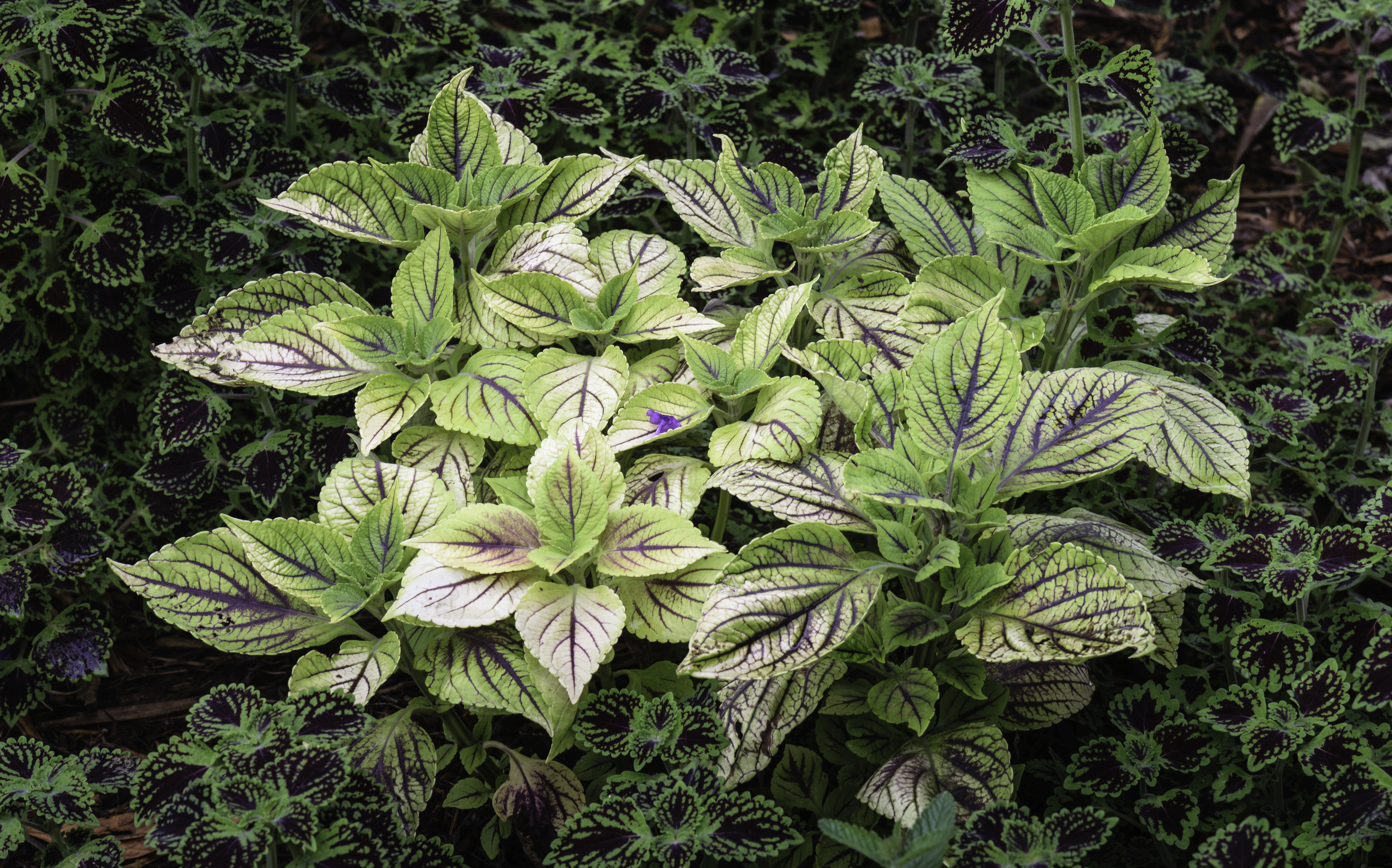

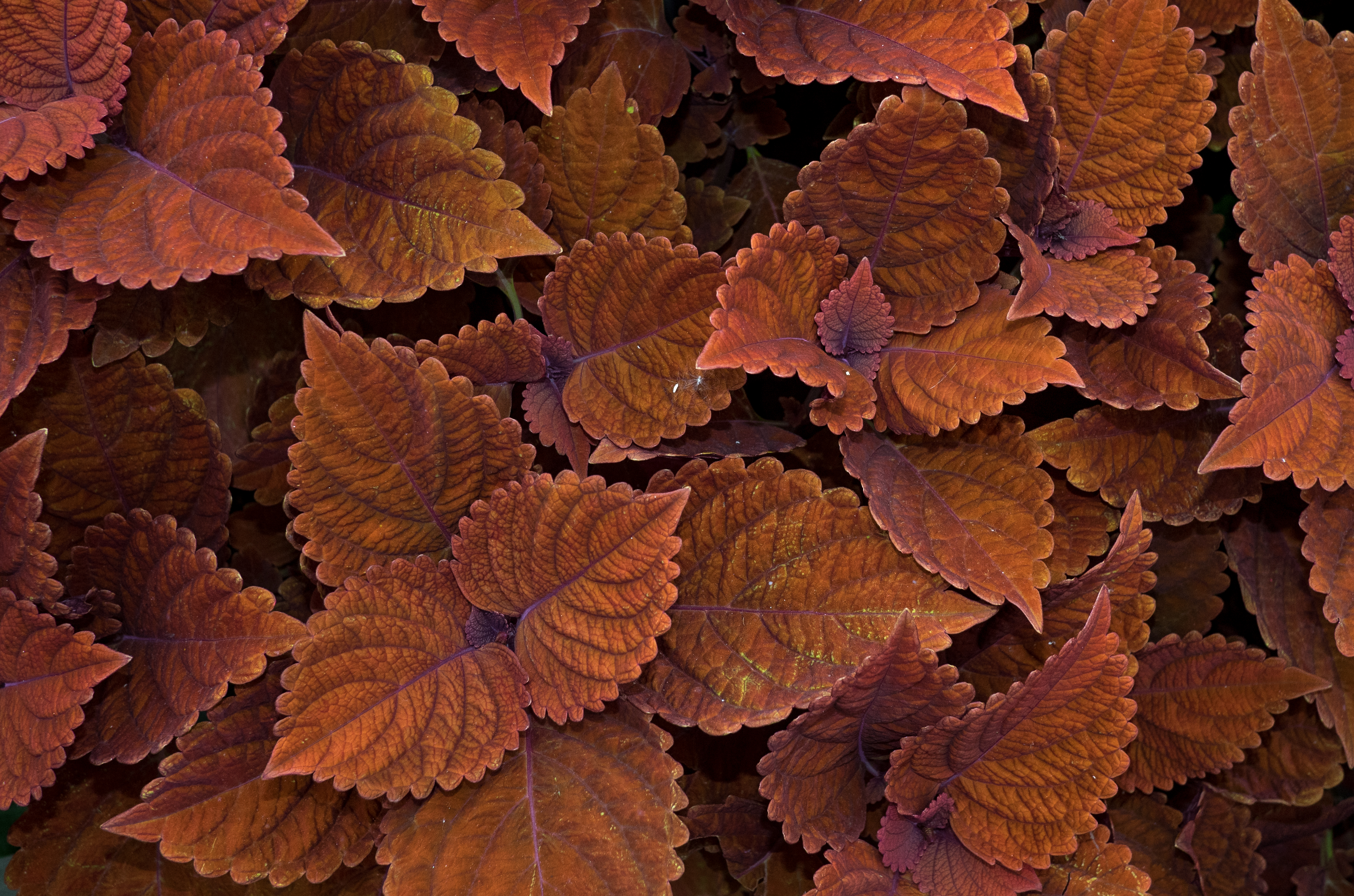

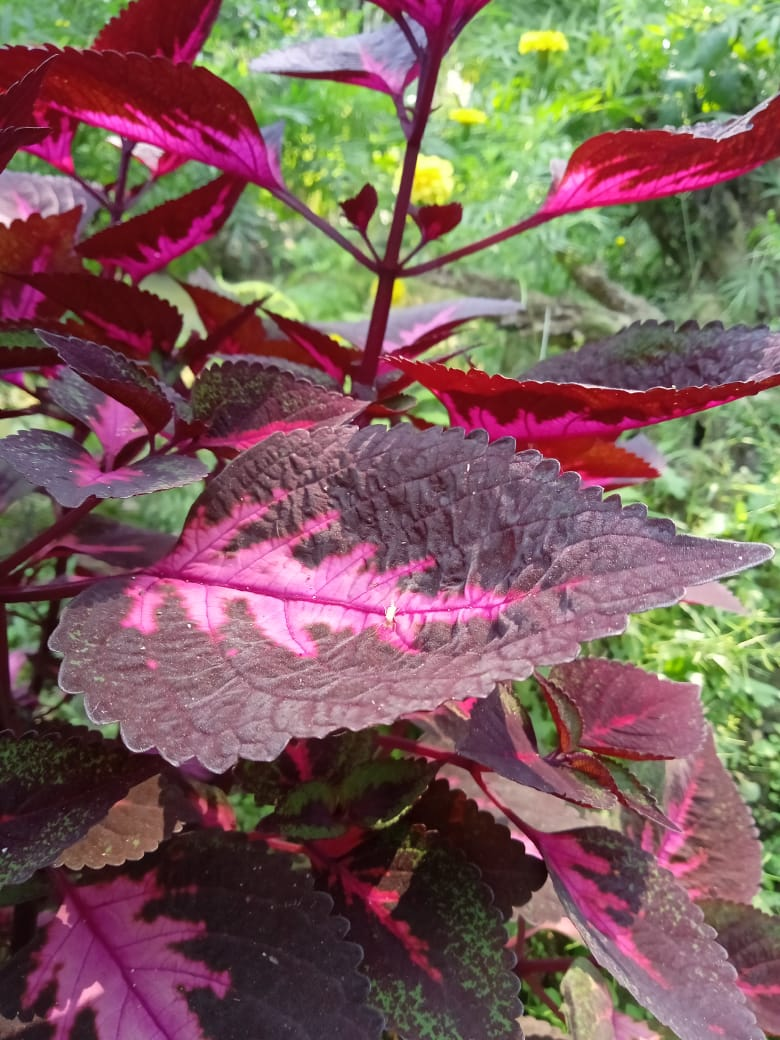

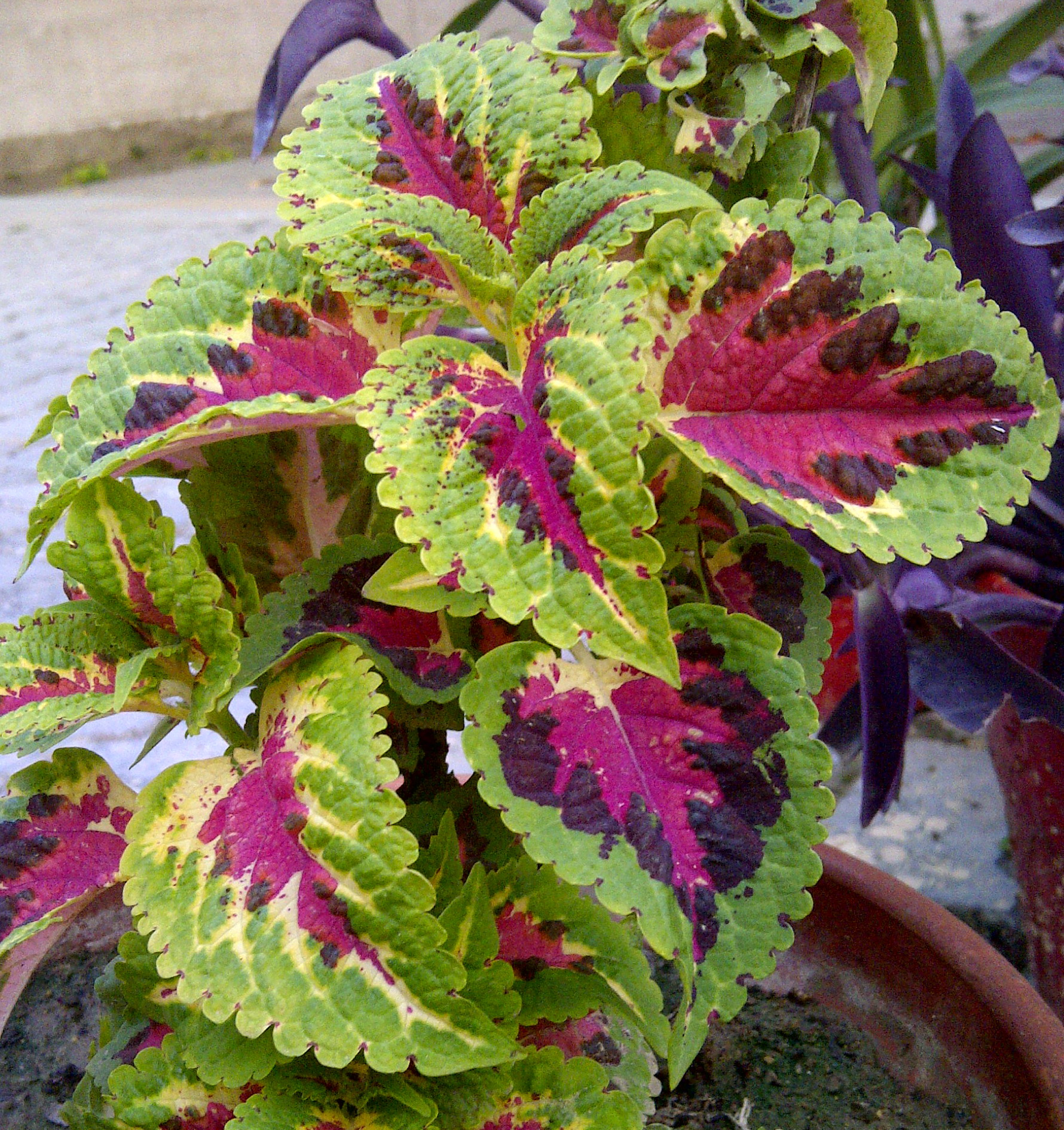

=== AGM cultivars ===
The following cultivars have gained the Royal Horticultural Society's Award of Garden Merit:

- 'Black Prince'
- 'China Rose'
- 'Combat'
- 'Crimson Ruffles'
- 'Gay's Delight'
- Henna = 'Balcenna'
- 'Juliet Quartermain'
- 'Lord Falmouth'
- 'Picturatus'
- 'Pineapple Beauty'
- 'Pineapplette'
- 'Pink Chaos'
- Redhead = 'Uf0646'
- 'Roy Pedley'
- 'Royal Scot'
- Trusty Rusty = 'Uf06419'
- 'Walter Turner'
- 'Winsome'
- 'Wisley Tapestry'

=== Care ===
In cultivation, plants grow well in moist well-drained soil, and are usually 0.5–1 m (1.6–3.3 ft) tall, though some may grow as tall as 2 m (6.6 ft). Coleus are grown as ornamental plants. They are heat-tolerant, but they do less well in full sun in subtropical areas than in the shade. In areas without freezing temperatures, plants can usually be kept as perennials if well managed. In colder areas, they are often grown as annuals, since the plants are not hardy and become leggy with age. In bright, hot areas, the colors of the plant are typically more intense in shade than in full sun, and the plants require less water there. Coleus also make low-maintenance houseplants, and can often be propagated by clipping a piece of stem just below the leaves and putting the stem in water to root. Young inflorescences may be removed to keep plants more compact.

=== Propagation ===
There are two ways to propagate coleus. Seeds are inexpensive and easily obtainable, though named cultivars do not come true from seeds. To germinate seeds, simply sprinkle seeds on the soil surface and press down. Seeds require light to germinate, so should not be covered. They may be kept moist by growing in a container covered with plastic, or by misting seeds daily. Sprouts can show color in as little as two weeks. Alternatively, cuttings can be taken. Cuttings root readily in plain water, without the addition of rooting hormone (although it is still beneficial).

=== Diseases ===
The downy mildew Peronospora sp. makes leaves brownish and can also cause leaf curling and twisting. It is harder to control this mildew on stems compared to leaves. Another disease is impatiens necrotic spot virus which causes brown or yellow spots on leaves, rings, black or brown stem discoloration, and brown leaf veins, ultimately resulting in plant death. The disease is spread by an insect called a thrips that carries the virus from an infected plant to an uninfected one. It only takes a few of these insects to infect a whole greenhouse.

== Psychoactivity ==
Coleus scutellarioides, under the name Coleus blumei, has been reported to have very mild relaxing and/or hallucinogenic effects when consumed. The effects of the plant have not been scientifically explored in great detail, but the plant is known to have been used by the Mazatec people of southern Mexico as a medicine.

== Gallery ==
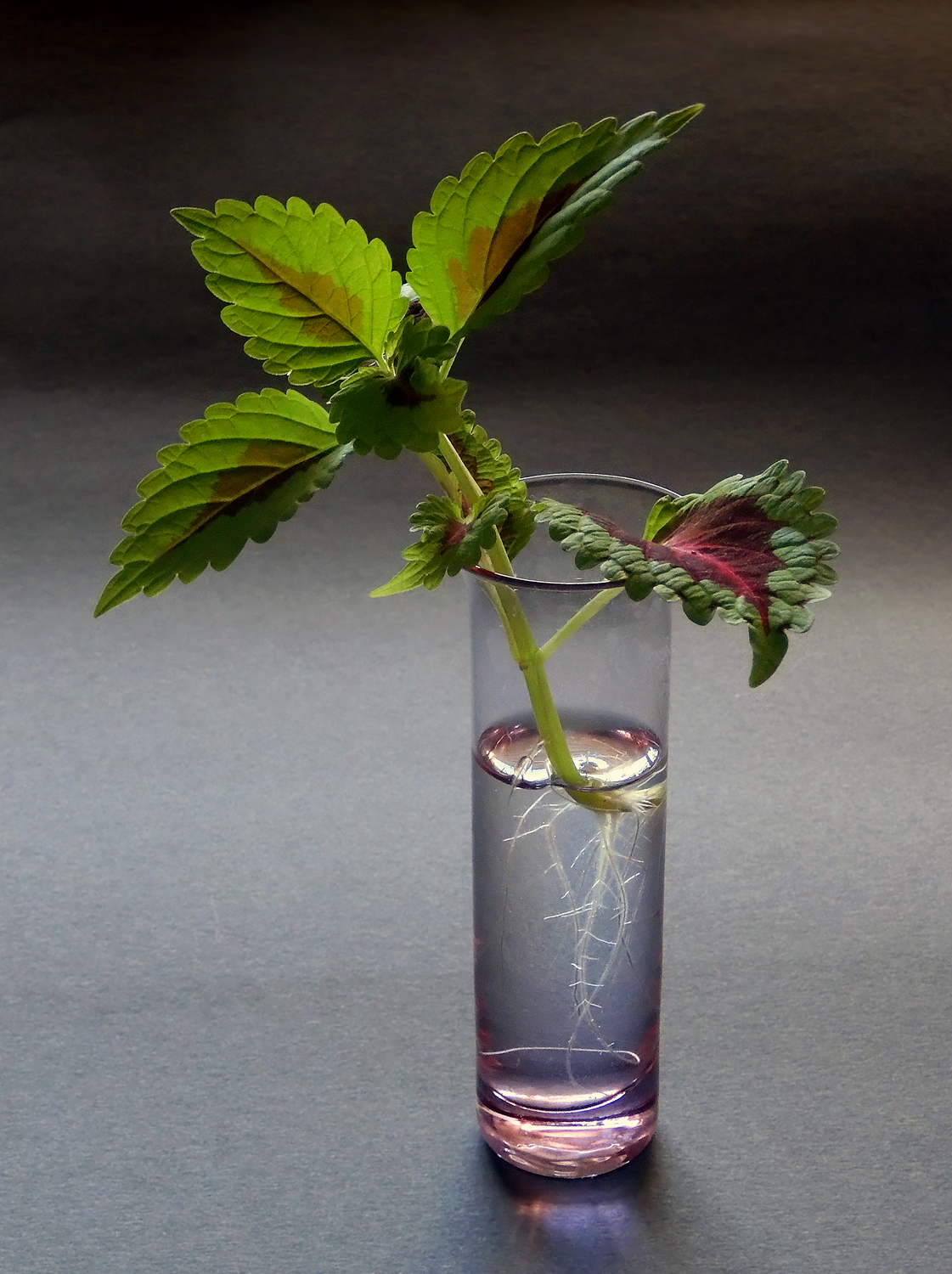
Cutting – after 14 days the roots are 6 cm long

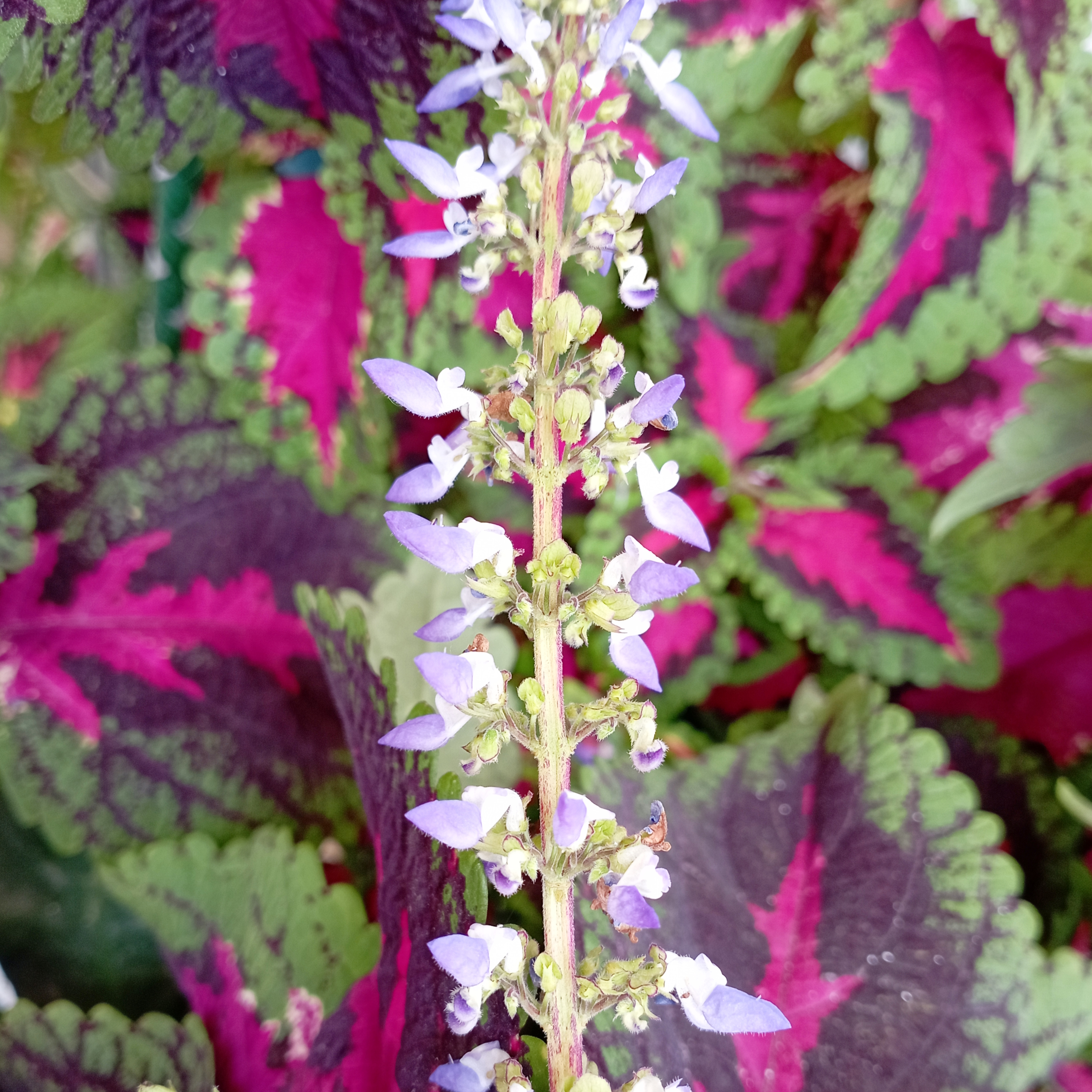
Inflorescence

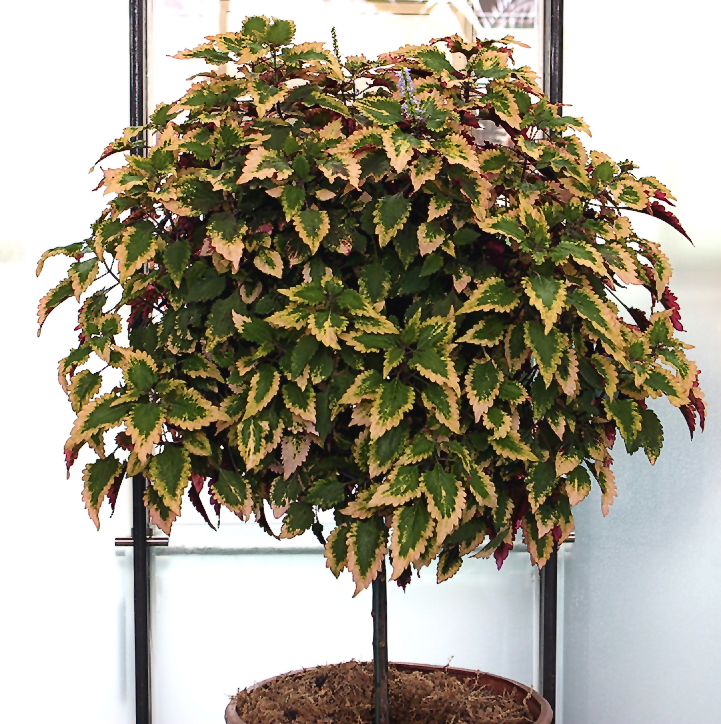
Cultivar grown as a short standard
