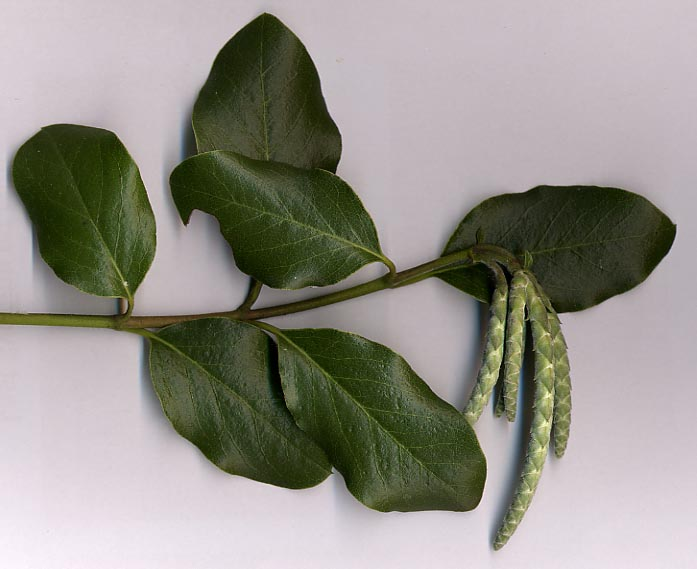

Conservation status
- Least Concern (IUCN 3.1)

Scientific classification
- Kingdom: Plantae
- Clade: Embryophytes
- Clade: Tracheophytes
- Clade: Angiosperms
- Clade: Eudicots
- Clade: Asterids
- Order: Garryales
- Family: Garryaceae
- Genus: Garrya
- Species: G. elliptica

Binomial name
- Garrya elliptica Dougl. ex Lindl.
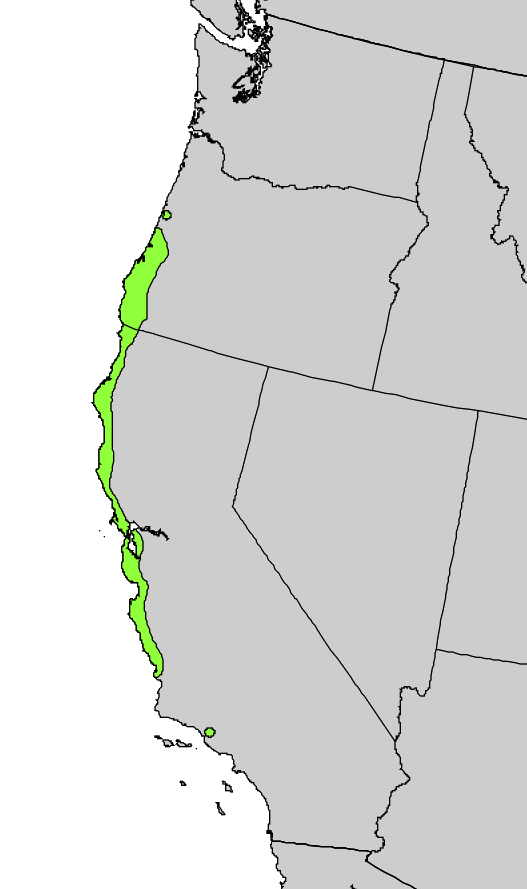
- Natural range

= Garrya elliptica =

Species of flowering plant

Garrya elliptica, the coast silk-tassel, silk tassel bush or wavyleaf silktassel, is a species of flowering plant in the family Garryaceae, native to the coastal ranges of California and southern Oregon. It is an erect, bushy, evergreen shrub reaching a height of 2–5 m (7–16 ft).

== Description ==
=== Growth habit ===
It has a multi-furcate branching structure yielding an almost spherical form. The height averages 3 m (9.8 ft) in the wild. Like others of its genus, G. elliptica has opposite leaves with a tough leathery feel, glossy green on top, but paler and duller on the underside.

=== Flowers ===
The dioecious flowers are concentrated in inflorescences which cascade downward as aments of 4–6 cm (1.6–2.4 in) in length. While it manifests separate male and female plants, the pendant male catkins are much more showy and are grey-green and up to 30 cm (12 in) long; the female ones are shorter and silver-grey. Although the flowers bloom in late winter and early spring, dried bracts remain on the plant well into summer as light gray decorations. The plant has smooth bark, dark-greenish when young, but roughening with age. New twigs are green and moderately stout.

For pistillate flowers, above each small bract there is a solitary flower inside the inflorescence. This plant produces tiny dark seeds. The ripened purplish black fruit of about 1 cm in diameter has a hard desiccated coating, but is rather fleshy on the interior. There are a total of four stamens per flower; moreover, above each bract pair there is a triplet of flowers. The cultivar 'James Roof' has catkins up to 30 cm (12 in) in length.

=== Leaves ===
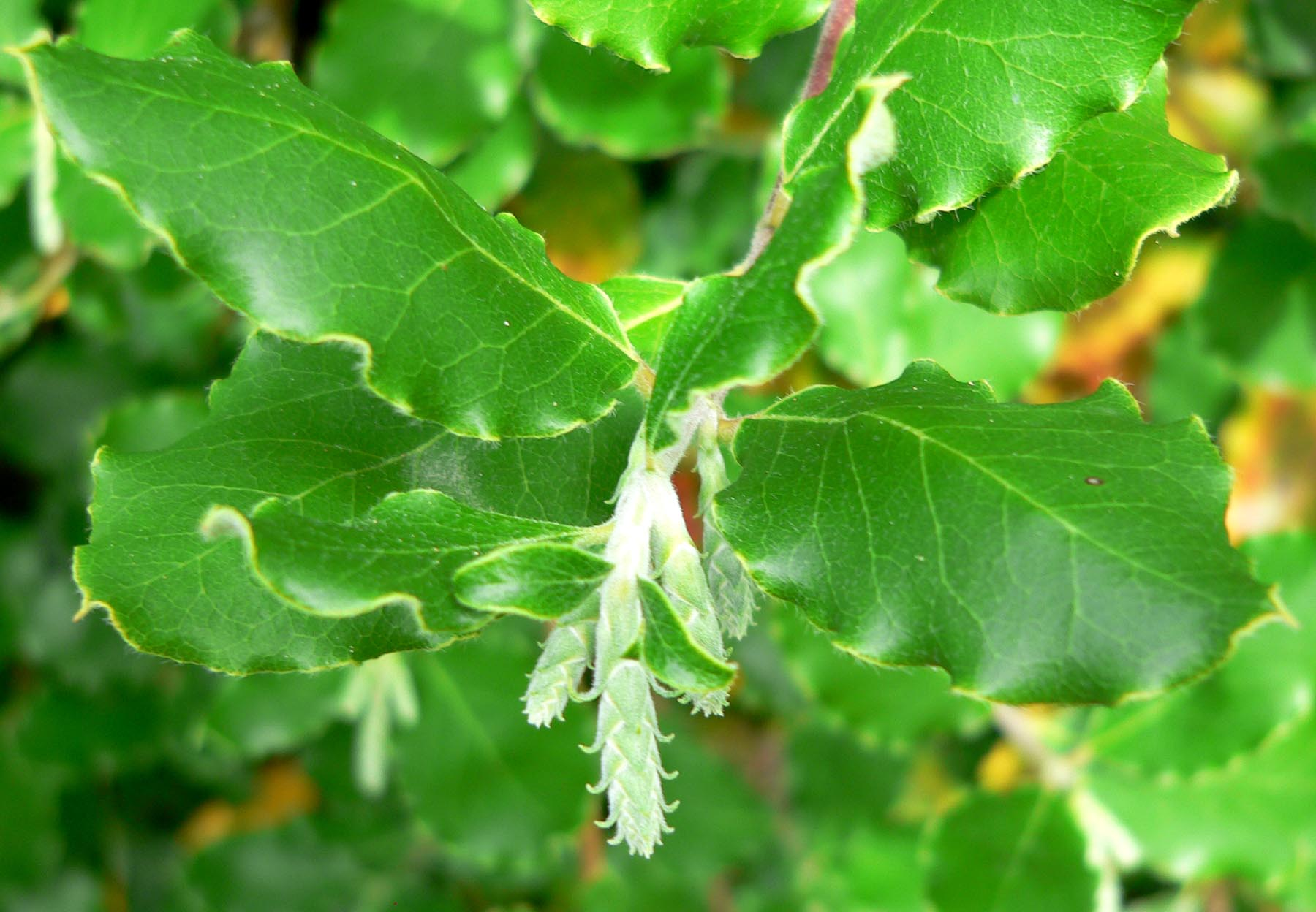
Wavy leaf margins

The unique characteristics of Garrya elliptica are its waxy convex leaves with wavy leaf margins, coupled with dense individual hairs on the leaf undersides that are scarcely distinguishable with a hand lens. Its leaf blades are 6–8 cm (2.4–3.1 in) in length, and the petioles range in length from 6–12 mm. For identification purposes Congdon silk-tassel (Garrya congdonii) is most closely related. Congdon silk-tassel has the same leaf appearance, but leaf hairs are distinguishable with a hand lens, and both leaf blades and petioles are about two thirds the size of Coast silk-tassel. Both Fremont silk-tassel (Garrya fremontii) and ashy silk-tassel (Garrya flavescens) have similar fruit characteristics, but have a flat leaf margin.

== Distribution and habitat ==
Garrya elliptica is found in several plant communities, principally in drier coastal California and southern Oregon no more than 20 miles from the Pacific Ocean; the main associations are coastal sage and chaparral ecoregion, Northern coastal scrub, Mixed evergreen coastal forest and Northern coastal sage scrub. This plant can tolerate moderately heavy clay soils and serpentine areas, but likes soils pH to lie in the range of six to eight.

It is not grazed to a great degree by deer or rabbits, and is hardy to cold temperatures of about 15 °F (−9 °C). It is moderately drought tolerant, but is more luxuriant with rainfall of about 25 in (64 cm) per annum. The species is usually found at elevations above 200 m (660 ft), within the mountains of the Pacific Coast range, such as Montara Mountain, San Bruno Mountain and Napa County.

== Cultivation ==
Garrya elliptica is appealing as an ornamental plant with a neat growing habit, and is widely used for landscape purposes. It is a low-maintenance plant that thrives in a range of locations, but is typically seen growing against a wall, or as a windbreak in coastal areas. The cultivar 'James Roof' has gained the Royal Horticultural Society's Award of Garden Merit.

== Etymology ==
Garrya is named for Nicholas Garry, who was secretary of the Hudson's Bay Company [circa 1820-35]. Elliptica is derived from Greek and means 'about twice as long as broad', 'oblong with rounded ends', or 'elliptic'; this is in reference to the shape of the leaves.

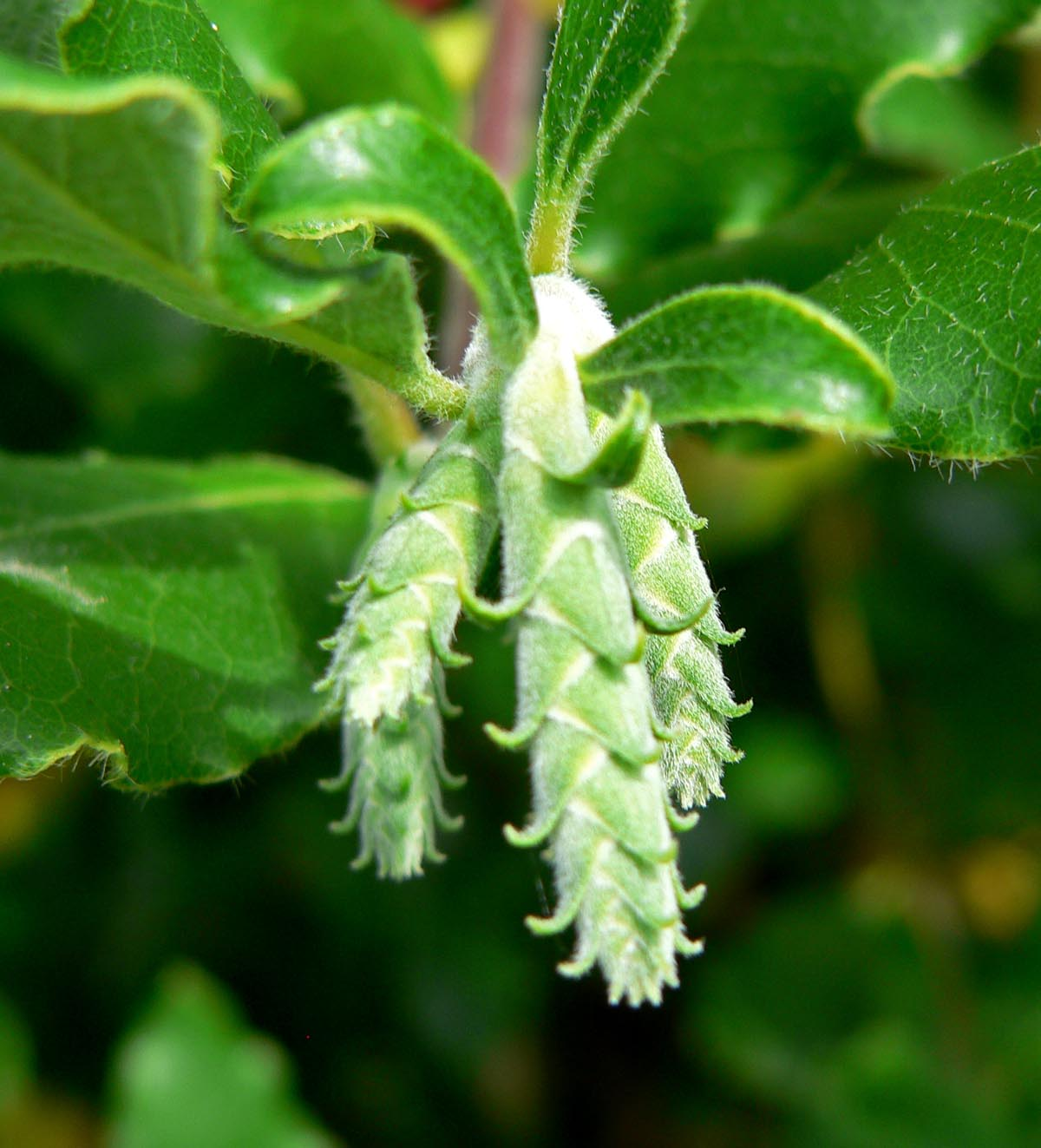
VanDusen Botanical Garden, Vancouver

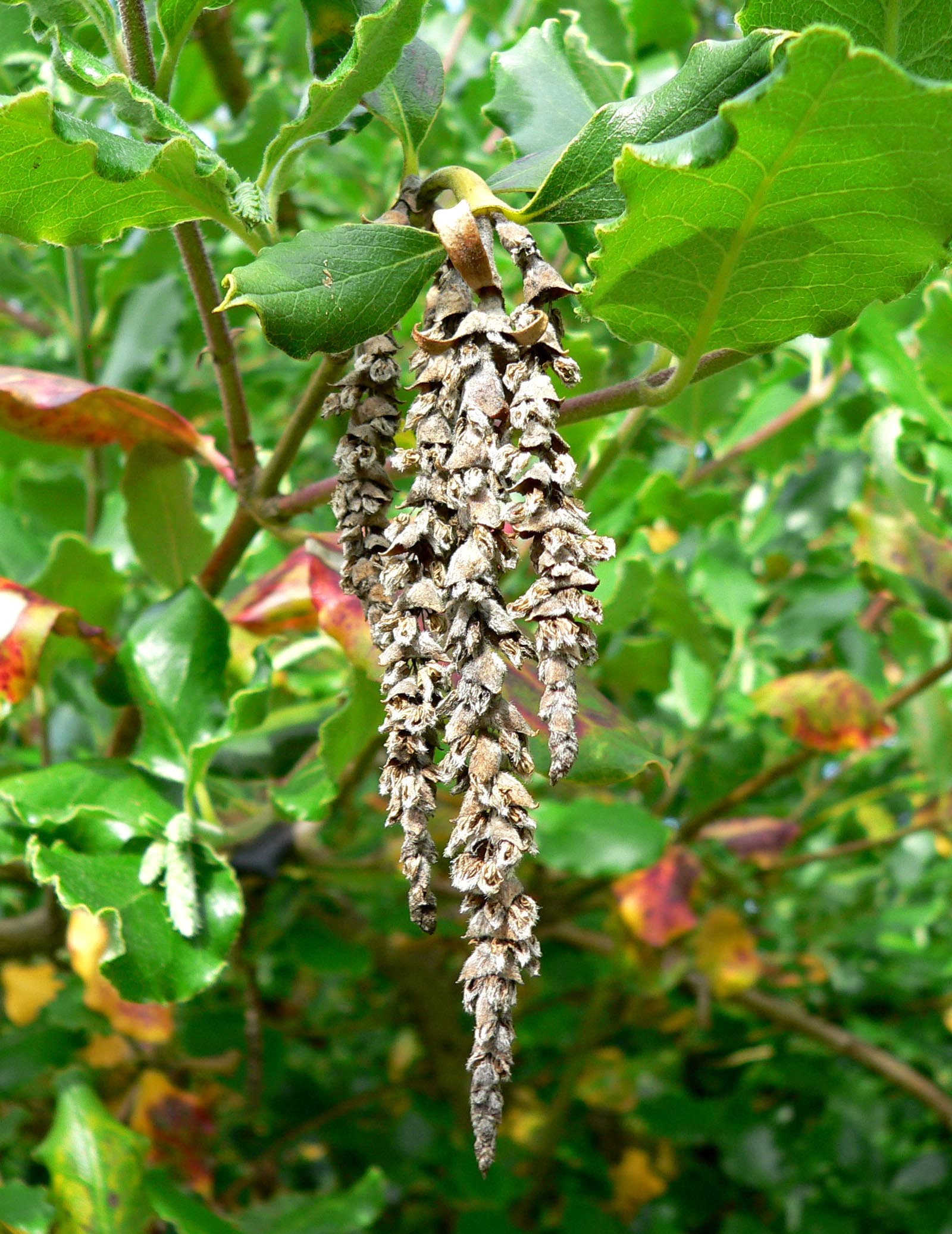
VanDusen Botanical Garden

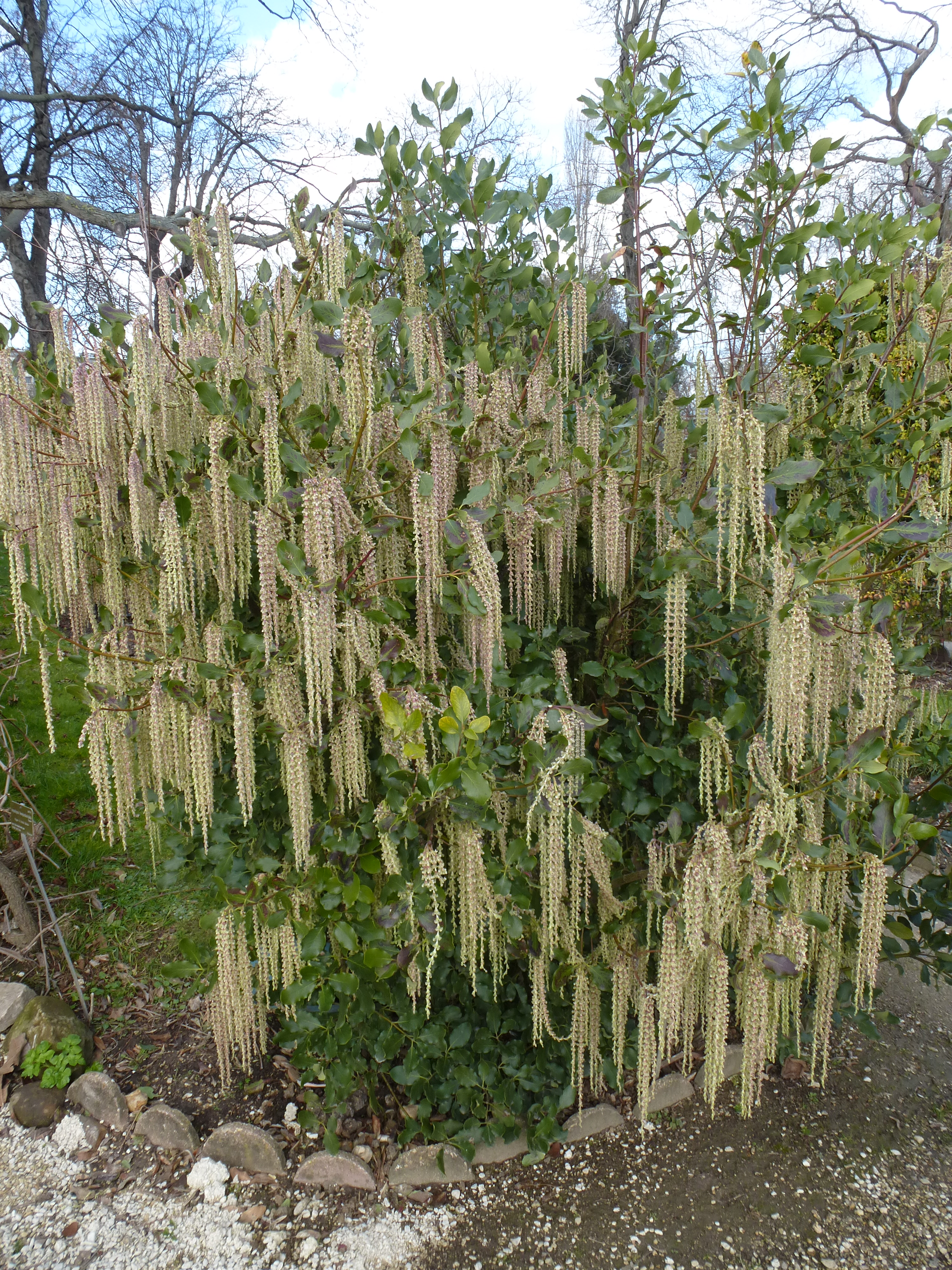
French National Museum of Natural History, Paris

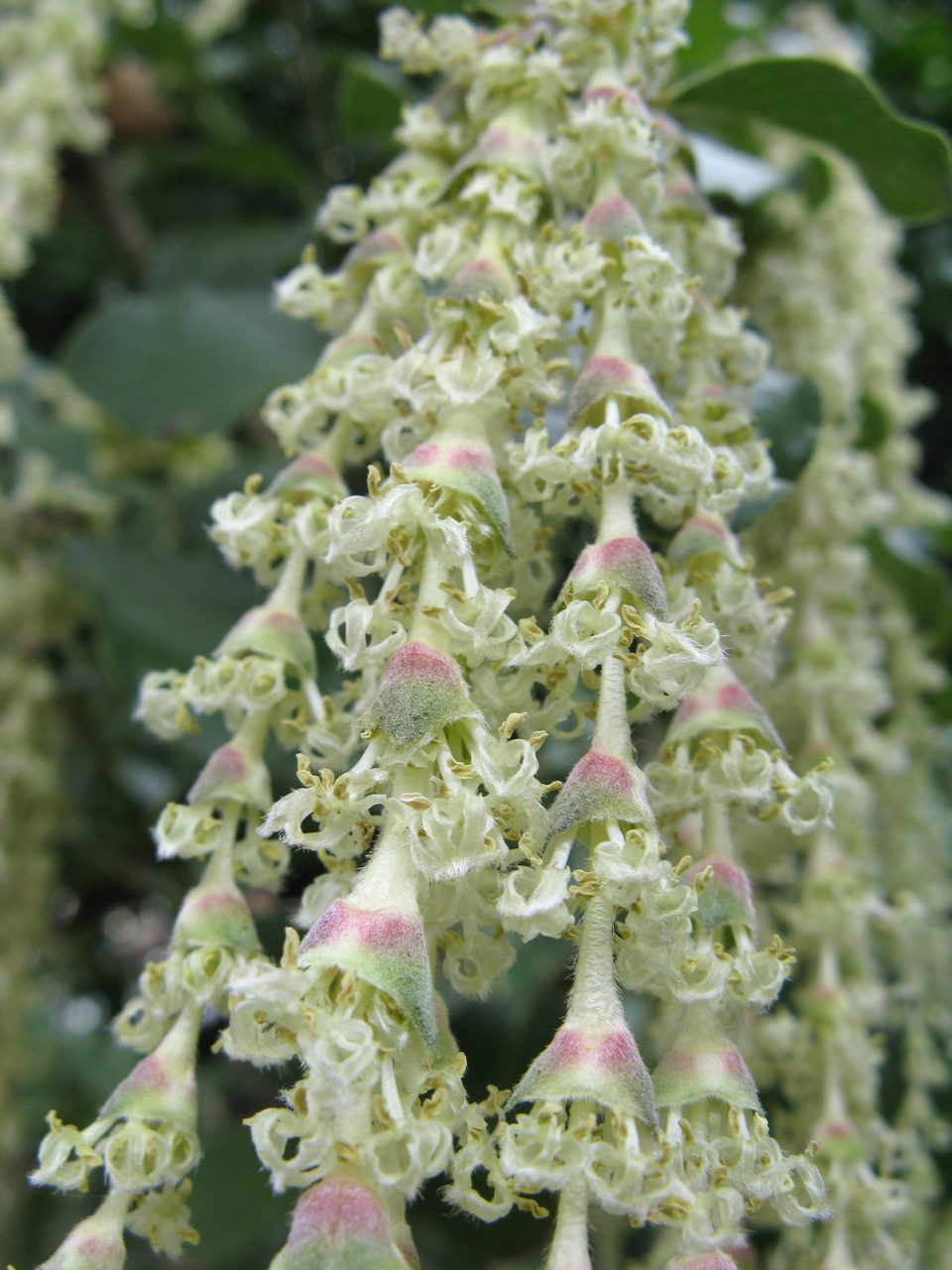
Male catkins

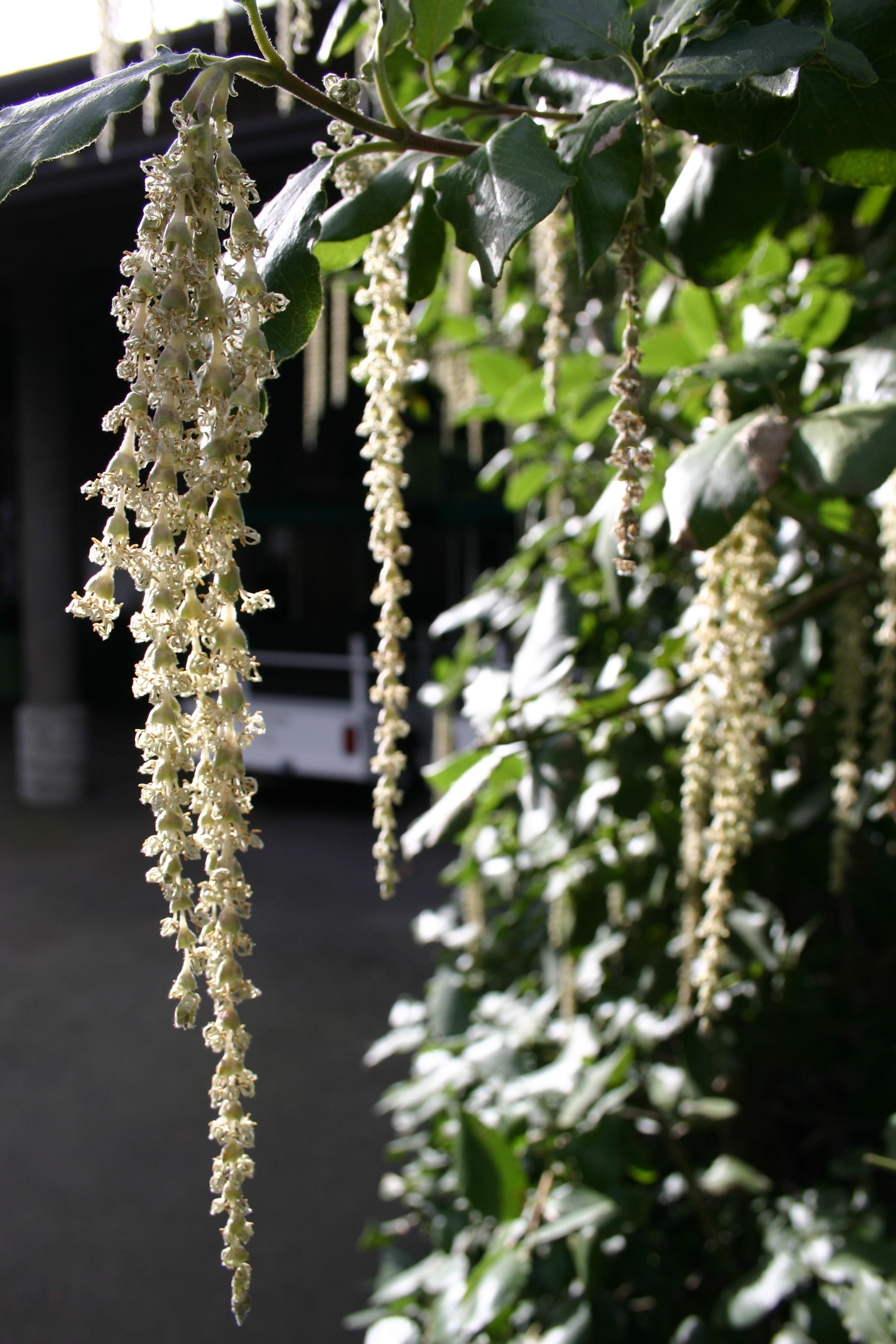
Woodland Park Zoo, Seattle
