= Tariric acid =

Names
- Preferred IUPAC name Octadec-6-ynoic acid
- Other names 6-octadecynoic acid

Identifiers
CAS Number	544-74-1
3D model (JSmol)	Interactive image
ChemSpider	205669
PubChem CID	235711
UNII	J6D59J8RYW
CompTox Dashboard (EPA)	DTXSID10284475
- InChI: InChI=1S/C18H32O2/c1-2-3-4-5-6-7-8-9-10-11-12-13-14-15-16-17-18(19)20/h2-11,14-17H2,1H3,(H,19,20) Key: GVZXZHWIIXHZOB-UHFFFAOYSA-N; InChI=1/C18H32O2/c1-2-3-4-5-6-7-8-9-10-11-12-13-14-15-16-17-18(19)20/h2-11,14-17H2,1H3,(H,19,20) Key: GVZXZHWIIXHZOB-UHFFFAOYAC
- SMILES: CCCCCCCCCCCC#CCCCCC(=O)O

Properties
Chemical formula	C_{18}H_{32}O_{2}
Molar mass	280.44 g/mol
- Except where otherwise noted, data are given for materials in their standard state (at 25 °C [77 °F], 100 kPa). Infobox references

Tariric acid is an acetylenic fatty acid that can be found in the tallow-wood tree, Ximenia americana.

Léon-Albert Arnaud (1853–1915) was the first scientist to describe the chemical make-up of tariric acid, an extraction from the glucoside of the "tariri plant" found in Guatemala.

== Occurrence ==
Tariric acid has been found in several oils and fats of plant origin. It was first isolated in 1892 from the seed oil of a species of Picramnia. It appears in Picramnia camboita from Brazil, Picramnia carpinterae from Guatemala, and Picramnia lindeniana from Mexico.

Tariric acid also occurs in the herb Marrubium vulgare (White horehound), where it is conjectured to have an anti-fungal role. It was found to stimulate lipid accumulation by adipocytes in vitro.

Tariric acid is biosynthesised from petroselinic acid; both fatty acids have been found together in Picramnia and Alvaradoa species. The occurrence of tariric acid as the major fatty acid is typical for the Picramniaceae.

== Production and chemical behavior ==
Tariric acid can be synthesised from commercially available petroselinic acid.

In chemical analysis, tariric acid can be separated from other fatty acids by gas chromatography of methyl esters; additionally, a separation of unsaturated fatty acids is possible by argentation thin-layer chromatography.
