= Petroselinic acid =

- Petroselinic acid

Names
- Preferred IUPAC name (6Z)-Octadec-6-enoic acid
- Other names (6Z)-Octadecenoic acid (Z)-Octadec-6-enoic acid cis-6-Octadecenoic acid cis-Δ^{6}-Octadecenoic acid Petroselinic acid 18:1 cis-6

Identifiers
CAS Number	593-39-5
3D model (JSmol)	Interactive image
ChEBI	CHEBI:28194
ChemSpider	4444569
ECHA InfoCard	100.008.901
EC Number	209-789-8
KEGG	C08363
PubChem CID	5281125
UNII	3A10DOC461
CompTox Dashboard (EPA)	DTXSID301026575
- InChI: InChI=1S/C18H34O2/c1-2-3-4-5-6-7-8-9-10-11-12-13-14-15-16-17-18(19)20/h12-13H,2-11,14-17H2,1H3,(H,19,20)/b13-12- Key: CNVZJPUDSLNTQU-SEYXRHQNSA-N; InChI=1/C18H34O2/c1-2-3-4-5-6-7-8-9-10-11-12-13-14-15-16-17-18(19)20/h12-13H,2-11,14-17H2,1H3,(H,19,20)/b13-12- Key: CNVZJPUDSLNTQU-SEYXRHQNBP
- SMILES: CCCCCCCCCCC\C=C/CCCCC(O)=O

Properties
Chemical formula	C_{18}H_{34}O_{2}
Molar mass	282.468 g·mol^{−1}
Appearance	White powder
Solubility in water	Insoluble
Solubility in methanol	Soluble

Hazards
- GHS labelling
Pictograms	(GHS07: Exclamation mark)
Signal word	Warning
Hazard statements	H315, H319, H335
Precautionary statements	P261, P264, P271, P280, P302+P352, P304+P340, P305+P351+P338, P312, P321, P332+P313, P337+P313, P362, P403+P233, P405, P501
Safety data sheet (SDS)	MSDS from Sigma-Aldrich
- Except where otherwise noted, data are given for materials in their standard state (at 25 °C [77 °F], 100 kPa). verify (what is ?) Infobox references

Petroselinic acid is a fatty acid that occurs naturally in several animal and vegetable fats and oils. It is a white powder and is commercially available. In chemical terms, petroselinic acid is classified as a monounsaturated omega-12 fatty acid, abbreviated with a lipid number of 18:1 cis-6. It has the formula CH_{3}(CH_{2})_{10}CH=CH(CH_{2})_{4}COOH. The term "petroselinic" means related to, or derived from, oil of Petroselinum, parsley. Despite its name, petroselinic acid does not contain any selenium. Petroselinic acid is a positional isomer of oleic acid.

== Occurrence ==
Petroselinic was first isolated from parsley seed oil in 1909. Petroselinic acid occurs in high amounts in plants in Apiaceae, Araliaceae, Griselinia (Griseliniaceae) and in Garryaceae. In Picramniaceae, petroselinic acid is accompanied by tariric acid. In addition, petroselinic acid has been found in minor amounts in several fats of plant and animal origin, including in human sources.

The occurrence of petroselinic acid as the major fatty acid is used in chemosystematics as a proof of a close relationship of several families within the Apiales as well as within the Garryales. Besides petroselinic acid, oleic acid has been shown to be present in all cases examined.

== Production and chemical behavior ==
Fatty acids mostly occur as their esters, commonly the triglycerides, which are the greasy materials in many natural oils. Via the process of saponification, the fatty acids can be obtained.

The trans isomer of petroselinic acid is called petroselaidic acid.

In chemical analysis, petroselinic acid can be separated from other fatty acids by gas chromatography of methyl esters; additionally, a separation of unsaturated isomers is possible by argentation thin-layer chromatography.

== Uses ==
Petroselinic acid can be used in cosmetics.
