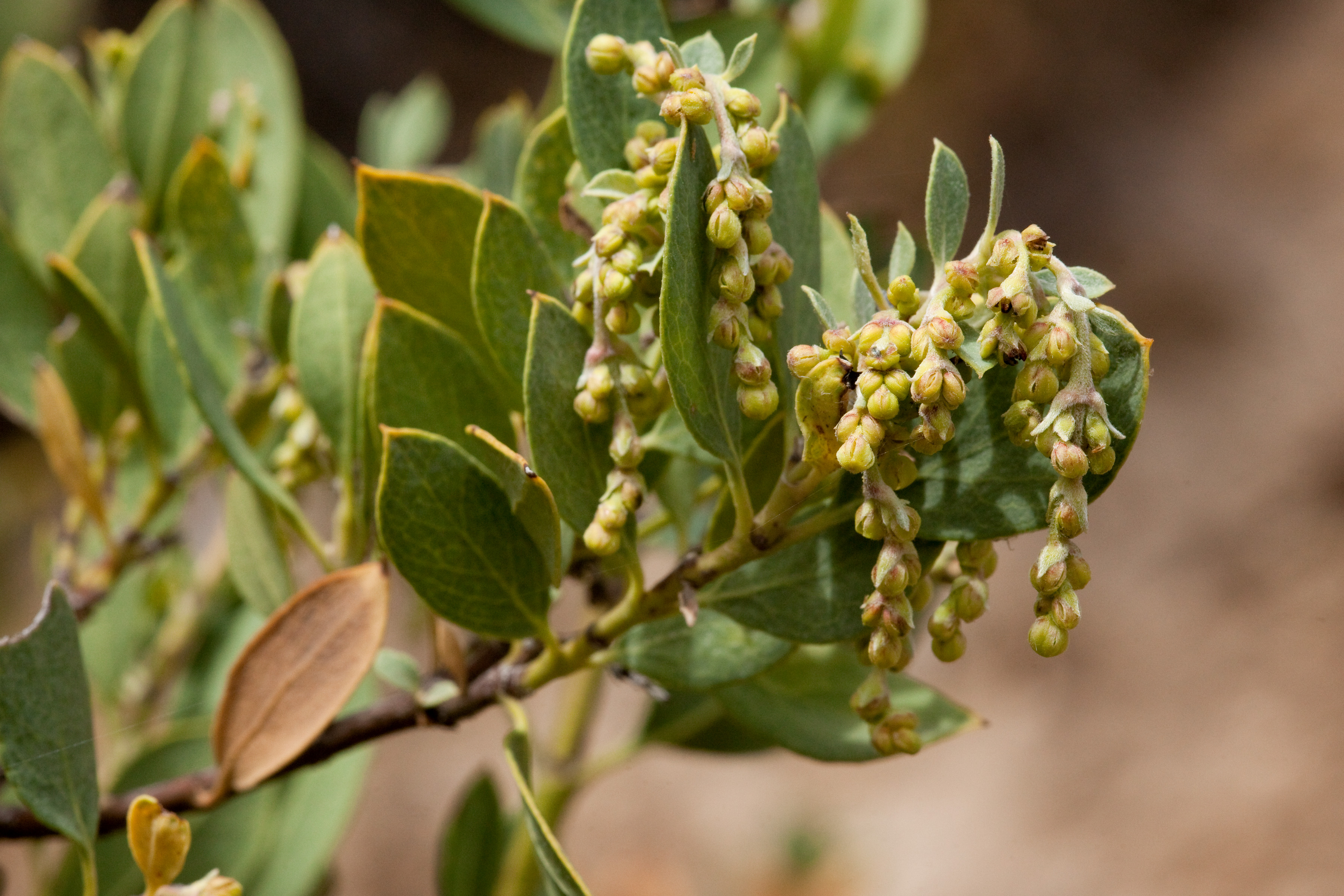

Conservation status
- Least Concern (IUCN 3.1)

- Secure (NatureServe)

Scientific classification
- Kingdom: Plantae
- Clade: Embryophytes
- Clade: Tracheophytes
- Clade: Angiosperms
- Clade: Eudicots
- Clade: Asterids
- Order: Garryales
- Family: Garryaceae
- Genus: Garrya
- Species: G. wrightii

Binomial name
- Garrya wrightii Torr.

= Garrya wrightii =

Species of flowering plant

Garrya wrightii is a species of flowering plant in the family Garryaceae known by the common names Wright's silktassel, quinine-bush, coffee berry, bearberry, feverbush, and grayleaf dogwood.

== Distribution ==
The plant is native to northern Mexico and to the southwestern United States in Arizona, New Mexico, and Texas. It is found growing on rocky slopes and in crevices of cliffs, from 5,000–8,000 feet (1,500–2,400 m) in elevation.

== Description ==
Garrya wrightii is a shrub slowly growing up to 12–36 feet (3.7–11.0 m) tall. It has branches that are square in cross-section and thick, tough leaves.

The species is dioecious with male and female reproductive parts occurring on separate plants. Both flower types are borne in catkin-like spikes. They are green.

The fruit is a rounded purple berry under a centimeter wide containing one or two seeds. The seeds are dispersed by birds that eat the berries.

== Ecology ==
This shrub grows in chaparral, pinyon-juniper woodlands, and Madrean pine-oak woodlands. It is rarely dominant but it occurs in many types of plant communities.

It grows alongside many species of oak such as Emory oak (Quercus emoryi), gray oak (Quercus grisea), and Coahuila scrub oak (Quercus intricata).

Other plants in the habitats may include birchleaf mountain-mahogany (Cercocarpus betuloides), true mountain-mahogany (Cercocarpus montanus), skunkbush sumac (Rhus trilobata), desert ceanothus (Ceanothus greggii), pointleaf manzanita (Arctostaphylos pungens), Pringle manzanita (Arctostaphylos pringlei), yellowleaf silktassel (Garrya flavescens), and hollyleaf buckthorn (Rhamnus crocea).

It is adapted to wildfire-prone habitat, resprouting after being top-killed in fires.

== Uses ==
Small amounts of rubber can be made from it.

Livestock occasionally eat the plant, goats are especially partial to it. Cattle tend to dislike it because of its bitter taste. Many wild ungulates, such as mule deer, bighorn sheep, and elk browse it.

=== Cultivation ===
Garrya wrightii is cultivated as an ornamental plant, for planting as a shrub or small multi-trunked tree in gardens. It is used in drought tolerant and wildlife gardens, in natural landscaping design, for erosion control, and for habitat restoration projects.
