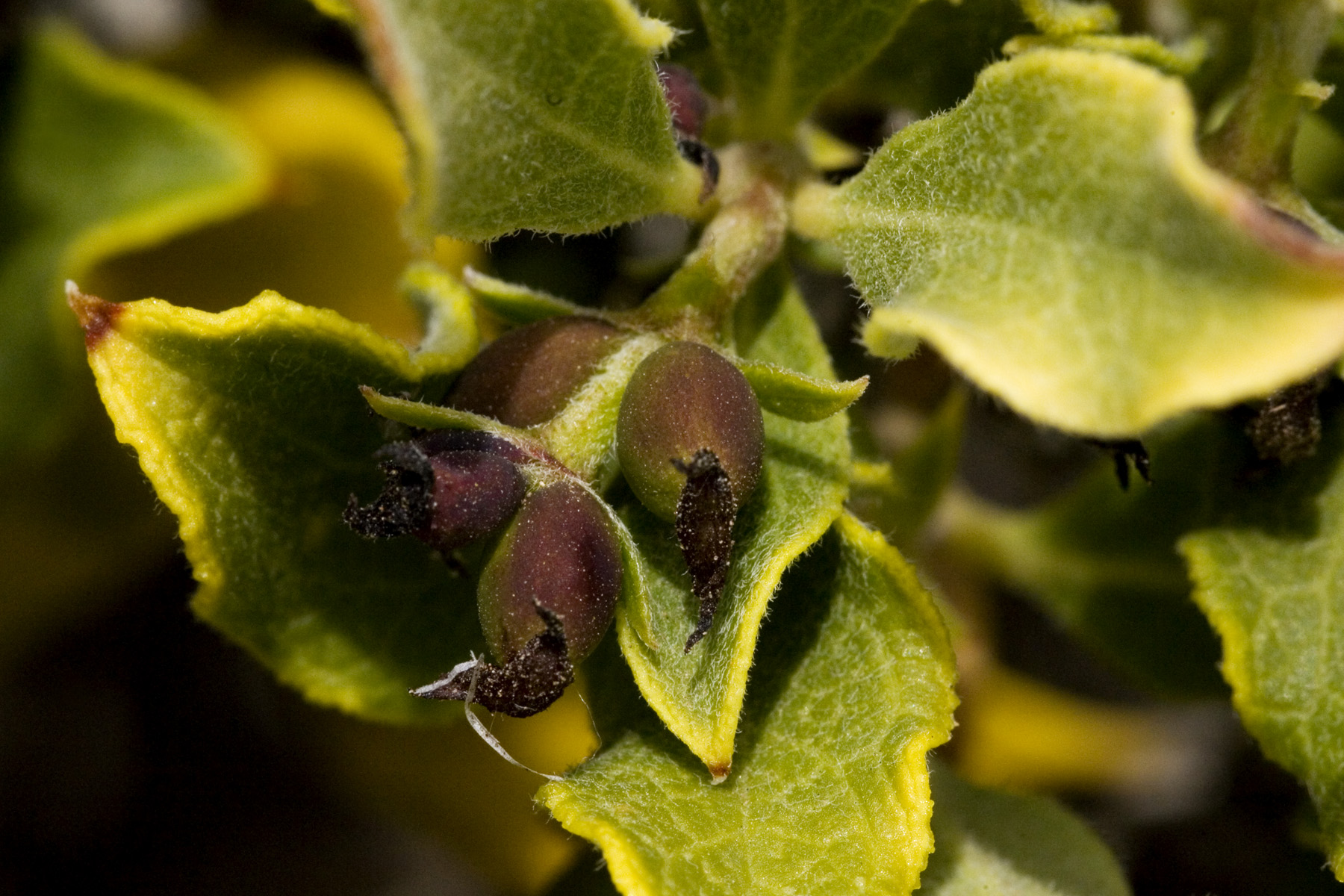

Conservation status
- Least Concern (IUCN 3.1)

Scientific classification
- Kingdom: Plantae
- Clade: Embryophytes
- Clade: Tracheophytes
- Clade: Angiosperms
- Clade: Eudicots
- Clade: Asterids
- Order: Garryales
- Family: Garryaceae
- Genus: Garrya
- Species: G. ovata

Binomial name
- Garrya ovata Benth.

Synonyms
- Fadyenia ovata (Benth.) Endl.

= Garrya ovata =

Species of flowering plant

Garrya ovata, the eggleaf silktassel, Mexican silktassel, or eggleaf garrya, is a species of flowering plant. It is a shrub endemic to Mexico, ranging from northeastern Mexico to Jalisco in western Mexico.

The plant is usually found as an understory species in moist forests, such as Madrean pine-oak woodlands.

== Description ==
Garrya ovata is a shrub up to 6–8 feet (1.8–2.4 m) tall and wide. The leaves are thick and leathery, ovate, up to 10 cm (4 in) long, tomentose on both sides when young, at maturity glabrous above but tomentose below.

Flowers are arranged in pendulous (hanging) racemes, and are green. It blooms in March through May.

Fruits are dark blue, spherical, up to 8 mm (0.31 in) in diameter.

== Taxonomy ==
The species was described by George Bentham in 1839. Two subspecies, G. ovata subsp. goldmanii and G. ovata subsp. lindheimeri, were formerly recognized, but they are now considered distinct species – Garrya goldmanii Wooton & Standl. and Garrya lindheimeri Torr.
