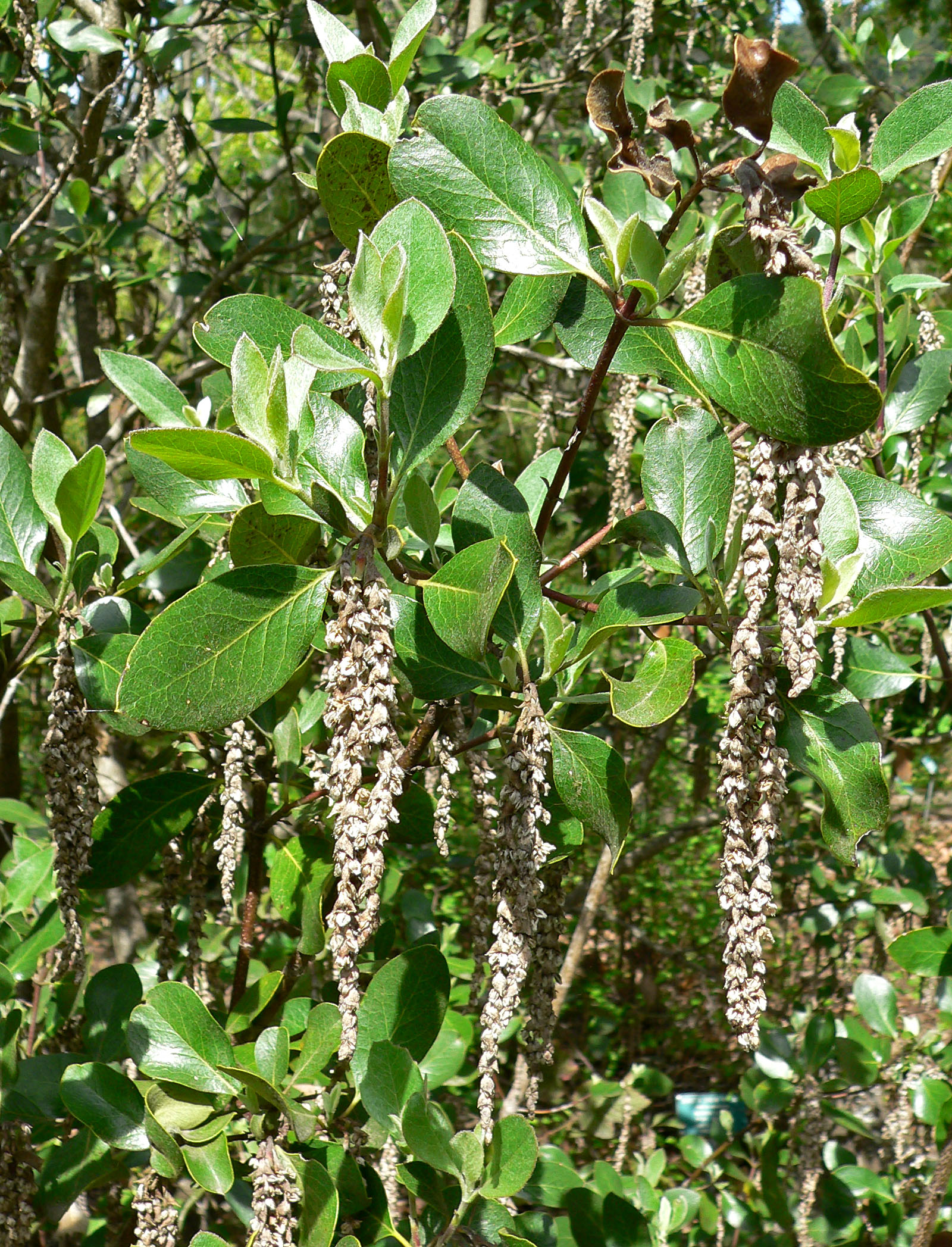

Scientific classification
- Kingdom: Plantae
- Clade: Tracheophytes
- Clade: Angiosperms
- Clade: Eudicots
- Clade: Asterids
- Order: Garryales
- Family: Garryaceae
- Genus: Garrya
- Species: G. buxifolia

Binomial name
- Garrya buxifolia Gray

= Garrya buxifolia =

Species of plant

Garrya buxifolia is a species of flowering shrub, known by the common names dwarf silktassel and boxleaf silktassel, in the genus Garrya.

It is native to Oregon and northern California, where it grows in forests and chaparral, especially in the coastal mountains and hills.

== Description ==
Garrya buxifolia is an erect shrub approaching three meters in maximum height and generally not sprawling very wide. It has a thick foliage of oval-shaped leaves, each several centimeters long and about half as wide, green and shiny on the upper surface and paler and hairy on the underside.

The inflorescence is a long, hanging cluster of flowers. The shrub is dioecious, with male and female plants producing similarly arranged inflorescences. Female flowers give way to hanging bunches or small clusters of fruits.

The fruit is a spherical berry which is green when young and turns reddish to dark bluish-purple when ripe.
