= Picramnia xalapensis =

Scientific classification
- Kingdom: Plantae
- Clade: Tracheophytes
- Clade: Angiosperms
- Clade: Eudicots
- Clade: Rosids
- Order: Picramniales
- Family: Picramniaceae
- Genus: Picramnia
- Species: P. xalapensis

Binomial name
- Picramnia xalapensis Planch.

Species of flowering plant

Picramnia xalapensis is a plant species native to the State of Veracruz, Mexico. Type locale is in the mountains near the City of Xalapa.

Picramnia xalapensis is a shrub to small tree. Leaves are evergreen, thick, leathery, pinnately compound, lacking stipules. Leaves are numerous, ovate to lanceolate, gradually tapering at the tip.
