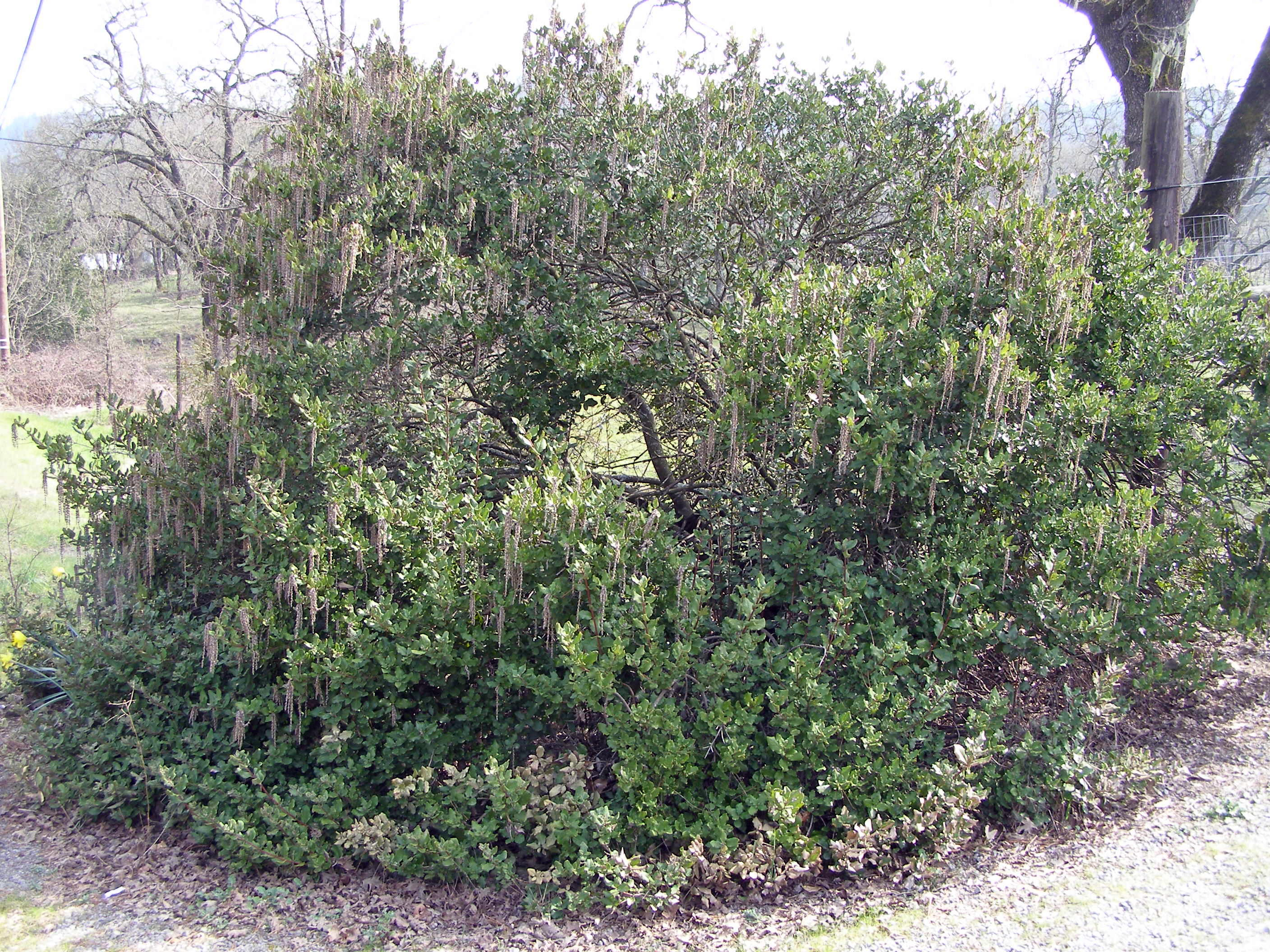
- Congdon silktassel

Scientific classification
- Kingdom: Plantae
- Clade: Tracheophytes
- Clade: Angiosperms
- Clade: Eudicots
- Clade: Asterids
- Order: Garryales
- Family: Garryaceae
- Genus: Garrya
- Species: G. congdonii

Binomial name
- Garrya congdonii Eastw.

= Garrya congdonii =

Congdon silktassel

Species of tree

Garrya congdonii, the chaparral silktassel or Congdon silktassel, a fairly common evergreen shrub native to the northern California Coast Ranges, is one of a small biological family of approximately twenty known species in the family Garryaceae, most of which are Garrya. While the female and male sexual organs of Congdon silktassel are on separate plants, the pendant male catkins are much more showy. This plant is reasonably attractive and neat enough in its growing habit to be appealing as a landscape species. It is stocked commonly at commercial plant nurseries. All Garrya are associated with warm temperate regions of North America.

== Description ==
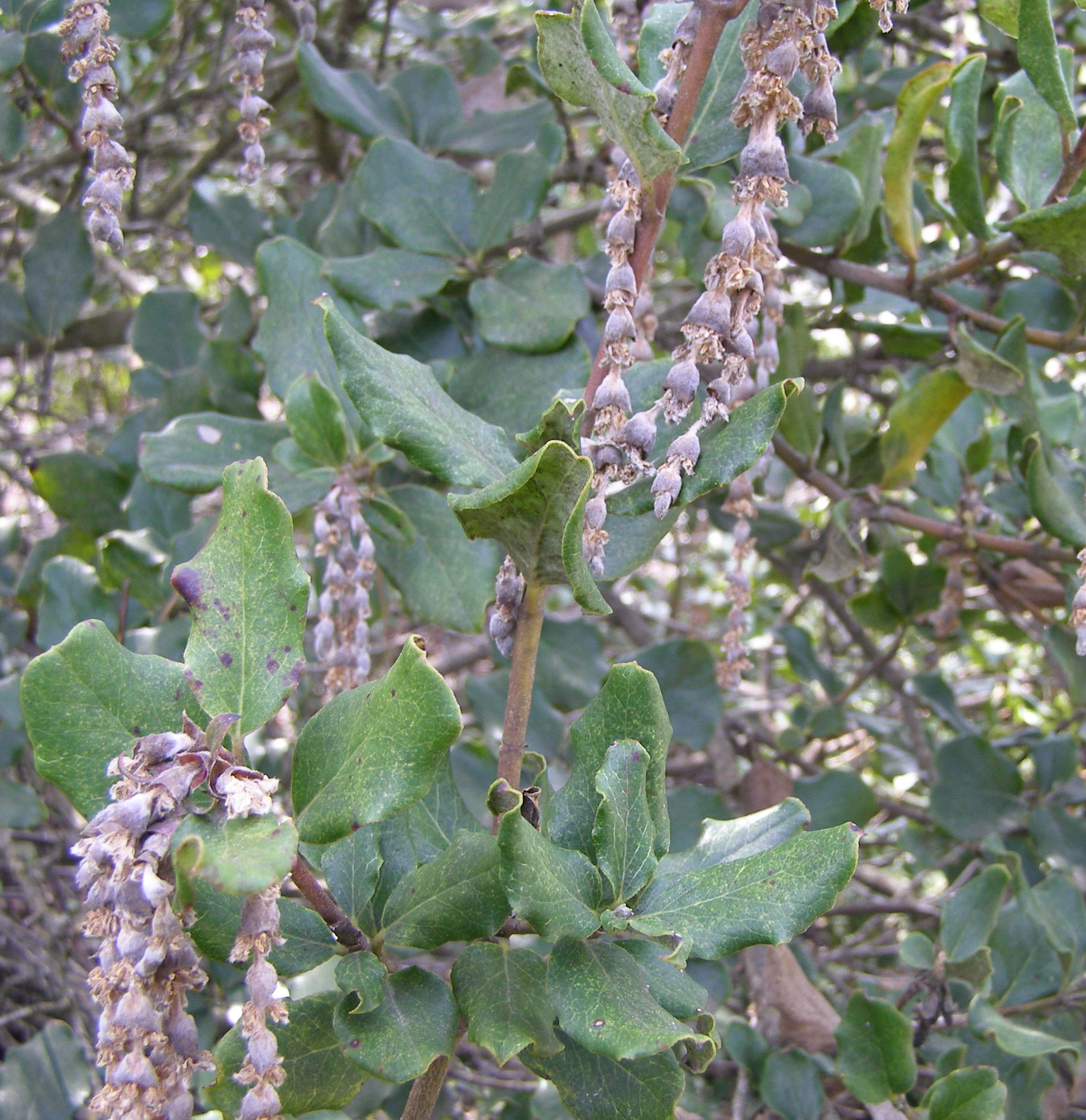
Leaves and spent blooms

Congdon silktassel has a multi-furcate trunk branching structure yielding an almost spherical form. The height can attain four meters, but more commonly averages two to three meters in the wild. Congdon silktassel, as all the genus Garrya, have opposite leaves that have a tough leathery feel, glossy green on top, but paler, slightly furry and duller on the underside. The dioecious flowers are concentrated in inflorescences which cascade downward as aments of approximately three to five centimeters in length. While the Congdon silktassel manifests separate male and female plants, the pendant male catkins are much more evident, up to 25 centimeters long; those of the female are shorter and silver-grey. Although the flowers bloom in late January and February, dried bracts remain on the tree well into summer as light gray decorations. The plant has smooth dark bark, dark-greenish when young, but with age the bark roughens. New twigs are green and moderately stout.

For pistillate flowers, above each small bract there is a solitary flower inside the inflorescence. This plant produces tiny dark seeds that can become airborne as small fluffy wind-blown cotton. The ripened purple to black fruit of about seven millimeters in diameter has a hard desiccated shell, but is somewhat fleshy on the interior. In the case of stamenate inflorescences, there are a total of four stamens per flower; moreover, above each bract pair there is a triplet of flowers.

The unique characteristics of Congdon silktassel are its leathery convex green (with a very slight yellowish tinge) leaves with wavy leaf margins, coupled with dense individual hairs on the leaf undersides that are scarcely distinguishable with a hand lens. Its leaf blades are six to eight centimeters in length, and has petioles which range in length from six to twelve millimeters. For identification purposes, Congdon silktassel has leaf hairs that are distinguishable with a hand lens, and both leaf blades and petioles are about two thirds the size of those on Coast silktassel.

== Habitat ==
Congdon silktassel is found in several plant communities, principally in drier inner California Coast Ranges no more than 20 miles from the Pacific Ocean; the main associations are Coastal chaparral, mixed evergreen forest (near a chaparral area) and northern coastal sage scrub. This plant can tolerate moderately heavy clay soils and serpentine areas, but likes soils pH to lie in the range of six to eight. An example of serpentine soils habitat is in The Cedars of Sonoma County, California.

This plant is rather resistant to being grazed by deer or rabbits, and is hardy to cold temperatures of about 15 degrees Fahrenheit. Congdon silktassel is moderately drought-tolerant, but is more luxuriant with rainfall of about 22 inches per annum.

== Differences with other Garrya species ==
Congdon silktassel is usually found at elevations above 200 meters. This species is usually found within the mountains of the inner Coast Ranges, such as Mount Hamilton ranging north to the inner Coast Range in Sonoma County, which is where the specimen photographed herein was found. Coast silktassel (Garrya elliptica) is most closely related species. Coast silktassel has similar wavy undulated entire leaf margins with somewhat darker glossier leaves, and the leaf topsides are more waxy and not quite so leathery as Congdon. The whitish hairs on the leaf underside of Coast silktassel are not readily visible with a hand lens as for Congdon silktassel. Coast silktassel is most commonly seen growing as individual plants rather than in groves, and can be found in the Montara Mountain range, San Bruno Mountain, and outer Coast Ranges in Marin County such as Mount Tamalpais.

Both Fremont silktassel (Garrya fremontii) and Ashy silktassel (Garrya flavescens) have similar fruit characteristics, but have a flat leaf margin. Fremont silktassel has yellow-green leaves and fruits that are almost lacking in hairs. Fremont silktassel is found from the Mount Hamilton area and Loma Prieta area ranging north to Marin County (for example, on Mount Tamalpais. Ashy silktassel (Garrya flavescens pallida) has grayish leaves and is reported to occur in the Alameda County hills.

Plants of the World Online treats Congdon silktassel as a synonym of ashy silktassel (Garrya flavescens).

== See also ==
- Joseph Whipple Congdon
