= Aconitum alkaloids =

Chemical structure of aconitine, an Aconitum alkaloid

Aconitum alkaloids are a сhemical family of organic compounds, plant alkaloids extracted from plants of the genus Aconitum and Delphinium, which are most often phytotoxins.

== Classification ==
Virtually all alkaloids isolated from plants of the genus Aconitum are diterpene compounds; they are classified into chemical ‘types’, although structurally, these are quite closely related compounds with some structural differences, although they are undoubtedly distinct. To date, around 1,500 identified diterpene alkaloids are known, discovered in plants of the genera Aconitum, the closely related Delphinium (Larkspur) and Consolida; Aconitum is one of the most frequently extracted and isolated sources of diterpene alkaloids, from which more than half of all natural diterpene alkaloids have been isolated.

=== C_{1}_{8}-Diterpenoid alkaloids ===
By classifying these сompounds as structures containing either 18, or 19 and 20 cyclically bonded carbon atoms (C18, C19, C20), that is, according to the number of adjacent carbon atoms comprising their central core, all systems represent heterocyclic frameworks containing nitrogen atoms from β-aminoethanol, methylamine or ethylamine; C_{18}-diterpenoid alkaloids are predominantly structures isolated from the plant Aconitum, and are subdivided into two distinct types: ranaconitine and lappaconitine. The main difference between them lies in the presence of additional oxygenation at the C7 carbon position in the ranaconitine type; nevertheless, ranaconitine-type alkaloids are also isolated from delphinium. The main characteristic of the ranaconitine type is: in this class, alkaloid compounds possess an oxygen-containing functional group at C7; one of the reference compounds of this class is ranaconitine.

Alkaloids of the ranaconitine type contain methylenedioxy groups, hydroxyl groups, dihydroxyl groups (or diols), very rarely a chlorine substituent, some double bonds, some methoxy groups, an N-acetylanthranilic acid residue, and a methine group fragment at the C7 position characterises compounds of the lappaconitine type; lactam carbonyl and acetoxy groups are quite specific to compounds representing weisaconitine; chlorine substituents and diols are also characteristic.

=== C_{1}_{9}-Diterpenoid alkaloids ===
C_{19}-diterpenoid alkaloids constitute the most extensive category of diterpenoid alkaloids; they are compounds classified into seven types (lactones, aconitines, lycoctonine, 7,17-seco, franchetine, the rearranged class and glycosides) depending on the oxygen-containing groups at C7 and differences in the skeleton; the majority of C19-diterpenoid alkaloids are of the lycoctonine and aconitine types, which are isolated from Delphinium. The presence of the oxygen-substituent group at the C7 position in the lycoctonine type constitutes the difference between them.

Aconitines do not contain an oxygenated atom at the C7 position. Due to the presence of an ester group at C8, and sometimes at C14, they tend to be more toxic. Some aconitines do not contain oxygenated groups at the C15 and C6 carbon atoms and rarely have a hydroxyl group at other positions (in particular C1), although there are exceptions. Some compounds of the aconitine type have a double bond between the C19 and N atoms, whilst others contain an additional CH_{2}COCH_{3} group; some are characterised by the presence of an anisoyl group at C14 and a double bond between C15 and C16; others have an anthranoyl substituent at C18 and a double bond between C15 and C16; other compounds have oxygen-containing groups at the C15 position. In contrast, other alkaloids have an oxygen-containing substituent at C6 and lack oxygen at C15. Some possess two oxygen-containing groups at C6 and C15, whilst structures containing a positively charged quaternary amine are occasionally isolated.
