= Monte Cristo Natural Area Preserve =

Natural area in the United States

Coordinates: 45.90534°N 121.55772°W

Monte Cristo Natural Area Preserve in Klickitat County, Washington is part of the Washington Natural Areas Program. It protects 1,151 acres (466 ha) in the eastern Cascade Mountains owned by the Washington Department of Natural Resources. The landscape includes grand fir and Douglas fir forest, dry grassland, and shrubland with patches of Oregon white oak - Frémont silktassel chaparral.
