= Picramnia bullata =

Conservation status
- Vulnerable (IUCN 2.3)

Scientific classification
- Kingdom: Plantae
- Clade: Tracheophytes
- Clade: Angiosperms
- Clade: Eudicots
- Clade: Rosids
- Order: Picramniales
- Family: Picramniaceae
- Genus: Picramnia
- Species: P. bullata

Binomial name
- Picramnia bullata W.W.Thomas

Species of plant

Picramnia bullata is a species of plant in the Picramniaceae family, that is only known from its type specimen, which was collected from Loreto Province in Peru. It grows naturally in Amazon basin rainforest.
