= Alvaradoa jamaicensis =

Conservation status
- Vulnerable (IUCN 2.3)

Scientific classification
- Kingdom: Plantae
- Clade: Tracheophytes
- Clade: Angiosperms
- Clade: Eudicots
- Clade: Rosids
- Order: Picramniales
- Family: Picramniaceae
- Genus: Alvaradoa
- Species: A. jamaicensis

Binomial name
- Alvaradoa jamaicensis Benth.

Species of flowering plant

Alvaradoa jamaicensis is a species of plant in the Picramniaceae family. It is endemic to Jamaica.
