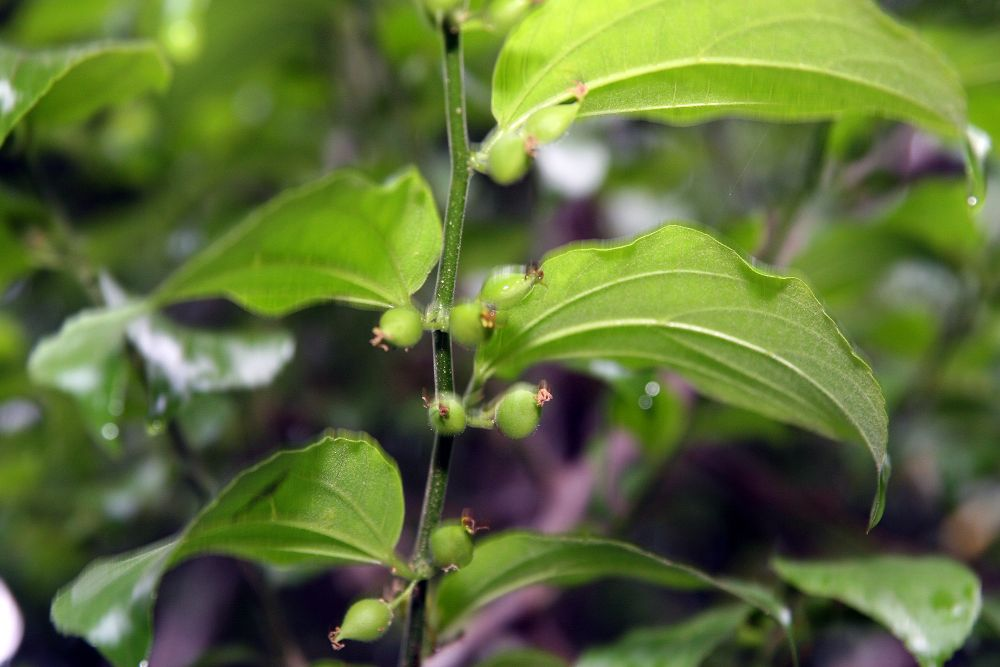

Conservation status
- Least Concern (IUCN 3.1)

Scientific classification
- Kingdom: Plantae
- Clade: Embryophytes
- Clade: Tracheophytes
- Clade: Angiosperms
- Clade: Eudicots
- Clade: Rosids
- Order: Picramniales
- Family: Picramniaceae
- Genus: Picramnia
- Species: P. antidesma

Binomial name
- Picramnia antidesma Sw.

= Picramnia antidesma =

Species of flowering plant

Picramnia antidesma (also known as Chilillo, Majoe bitters, or Macary bitters) is a species of plant in the Picramniaceae family, native to Mexico, Central America, and the Greater Antilles.

In his posthumously published work Hortus Americanus, surgeon and naturalist Henry Barham credits an "old negro woman," Majoe, with using the plant as a treatment for yaws and venereal disease. Barham describes seeing the plant growing near St. Jago de la Vega in Jamaica and its use among enslaved people in the area.
