= Quinine bush =

Quinine bush may refer to several flowering plant species:

- Alstonia constricta, an Australian endemic plant in the family Apocynaceae.
- Garrya wrightii, a plant native to Mexico and the US, in the family Garryaceae.
- Petalostigma pubescens, a rainforest tree native to Papua New Guinea and Australia, in the family Picrodendraceae.
