= Cedrinho =

Cedrinho is a Portuguese language common name for several plants and may refer to:

- Cedrela fissilis, in the family Meliaceae
- Erisma uncinatum, a tropical hardwood in the family Vochysiaceae
- Guarea balansae, in the family Meliaceae
- Picramnia parvifolia, in the family Picramniaceae

== See also ==
- pt:Cedrinho
