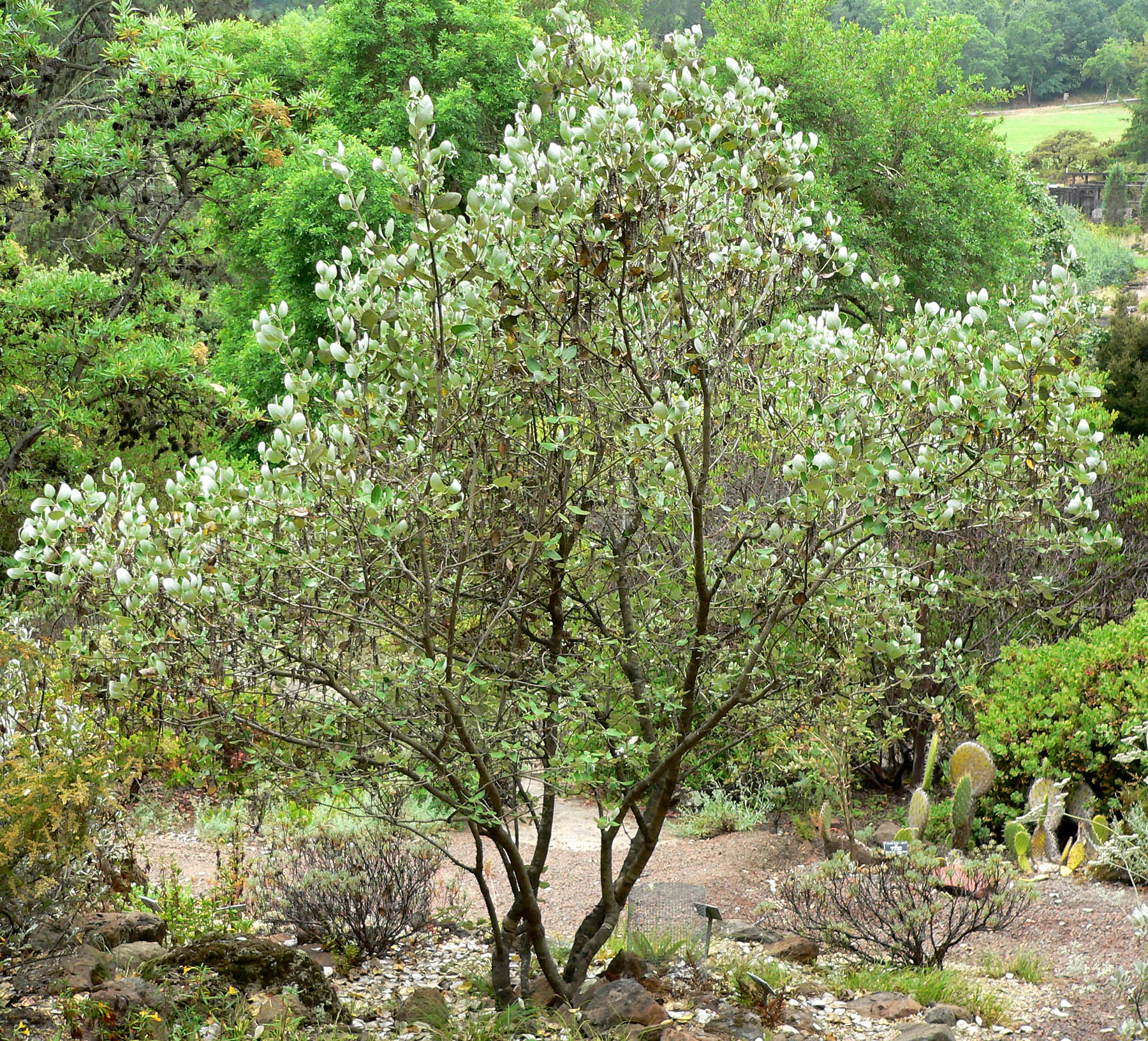

Conservation status
- Least Concern (IUCN 3.1)

Scientific classification
- Kingdom: Plantae
- Clade: Embryophytes
- Clade: Tracheophytes
- Clade: Angiosperms
- Clade: Eudicots
- Clade: Asterids
- Order: Garryales
- Family: Garryaceae
- Genus: Garrya
- Species: G. veatchii

Binomial name
- Garrya veatchii Kellogg

Synonyms
- Garrya flavescens var. palmeri S.Watson; Garrya veatchii var. palmeri (S.Watson) Eastw.; Garrya veatchii var. undulata Eastw.

= Garrya veatchii =

Species of plant

Garrya veatchii is a species of flowering shrub known by the common names canyon silktassel and Veatch silktassel.

It is native to the chaparral hills of Southern California and Baja California.

== Description ==
Garrya veatchii is a small treelike or bushy shrub reaching maximum heights near 2 metres (6.6 ft). It has oval-shaped leaves 3 to 9 centimeters long and about half as wide with margins flat, wavy, or slightly rolled, and undersides covered thinly to thickly in woolly hairs.

It produces long, hanging inflorescences of light-colored flowers, those on female plants giving way to hanging clusters of fruits.

The fruit is a spherical to egg-shaped berry covered in a soft coat of hairs.
