= Léon-Albert Arnaud =

French chemist

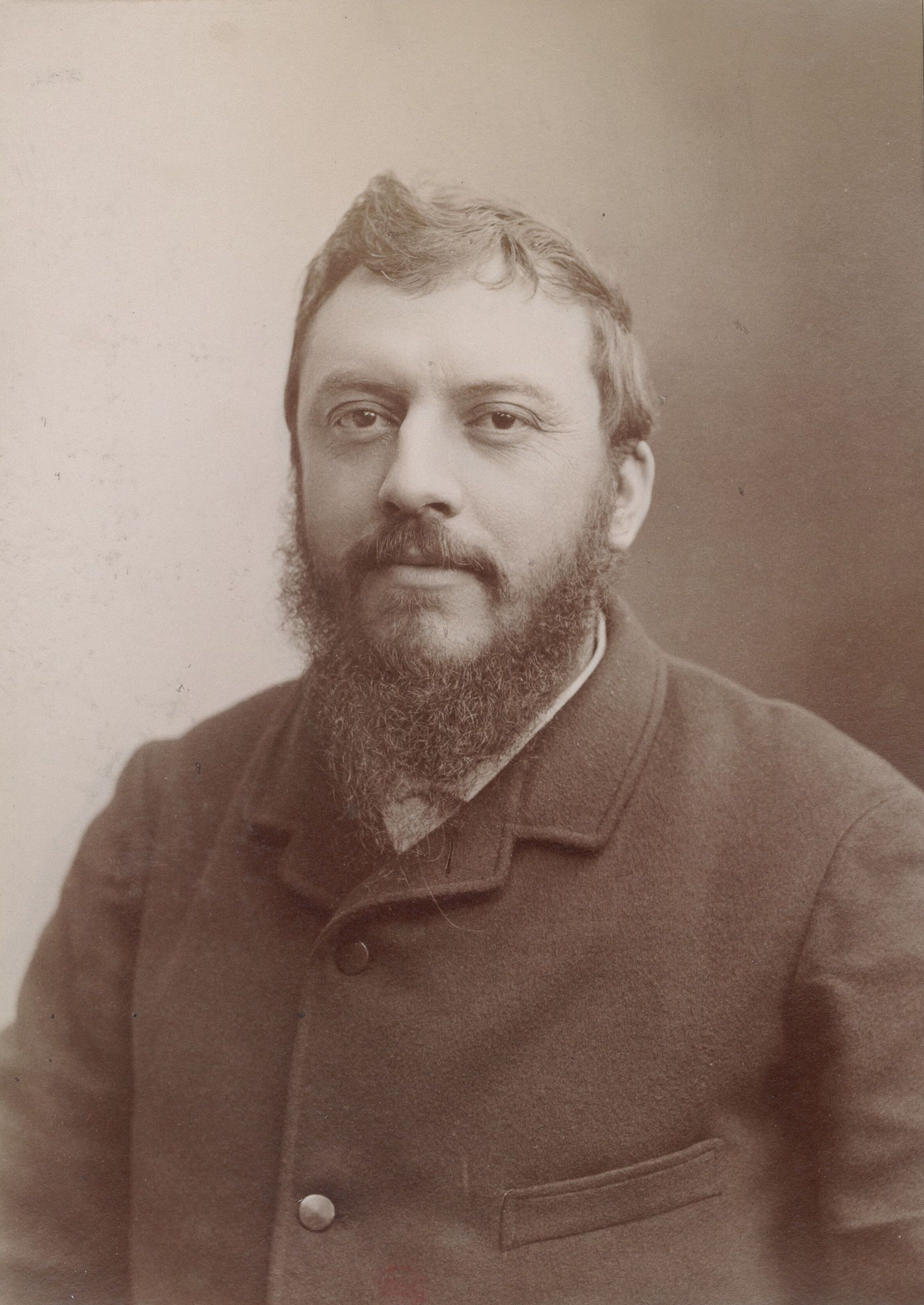

Léon-Albert Arnaud (15 February 1853 – 27 March 1915) was a French chemist born in Paris.

From 1872 he worked as an assistant in the laboratory of Michel Eugène Chevreul (1786–1889) at the Muséum national d'histoire naturelle. In 1883 he succeeded François Stanislas Cloez (1817–1883) as aide-naturaliste, and from 1890 to 1915 was chair of applied organic chemistry at the museum.

Arnaud was the first scientist to describe the chemical make-up of tariric acid, an extraction from the glucoside of the "tariri plant" found in Guatemala. He is also credited with isolating tanghinine, taken from Tanghinia venenifera; (family Apocynaceae), and in 1883 discovered a new alkaloid called cinchonamine.
