= Aenigmanu =

Scientific classification
- Kingdom: Plantae
- Clade: Tracheophytes
- Clade: Angiosperms
- Clade: Eudicots
- Clade: Rosids
- Order: Picramniales
- Family: Picramniaceae
- Genus: Aenigmanu; W.W.Thomas (2021)
- Species: A. alvareziae

Binomial name
- Aenigmanu alvareziae W.W.Thomas (2021)

Genus of flowering plants

Aenigmanu alvareziae is a species of flowering plant in the family Picramniaceae. It is the sole species in genus Aenigmanu. It is native to the Amazon rainforest of Peru and northwestern Brazil's Acre state. It is an understory rainforest tree to about 6 m (20 ft) in height. Its most curious characteristic is the fruit, which is like an orange paper lantern. It was discovered by Robin Foster in 1973, but resisted classification for many years.

== Etymology ==
The generic name means "Enigma from Manu" National Park, Peru. The specific name honors Patricia Alvarez-loayza the taxonomist who finally solved the riddle.
