= Nothotalisia =

Scientific classification
- Kingdom: Plantae
- Clade: Tracheophytes
- Clade: Angiosperms
- Clade: Eudicots
- Clade: Rosids
- Order: Picramniales
- Family: Picramniaceae
- Genus: Nothotalisia; W.W.Thomas

Genus of plants

Nothotalisia is a genus of flowering plants belonging to the family Picramniaceae.

Its native range is Panama to Bolivia and Northern Brazil.

Species:

- Nothotalisia cancellata W.W.Thomas
- Nothotalisia peruviana (Standl.) W.W.Thomas
- Nothotalisia piranii W.W.Thomas
