= Diterpene alkaloids =

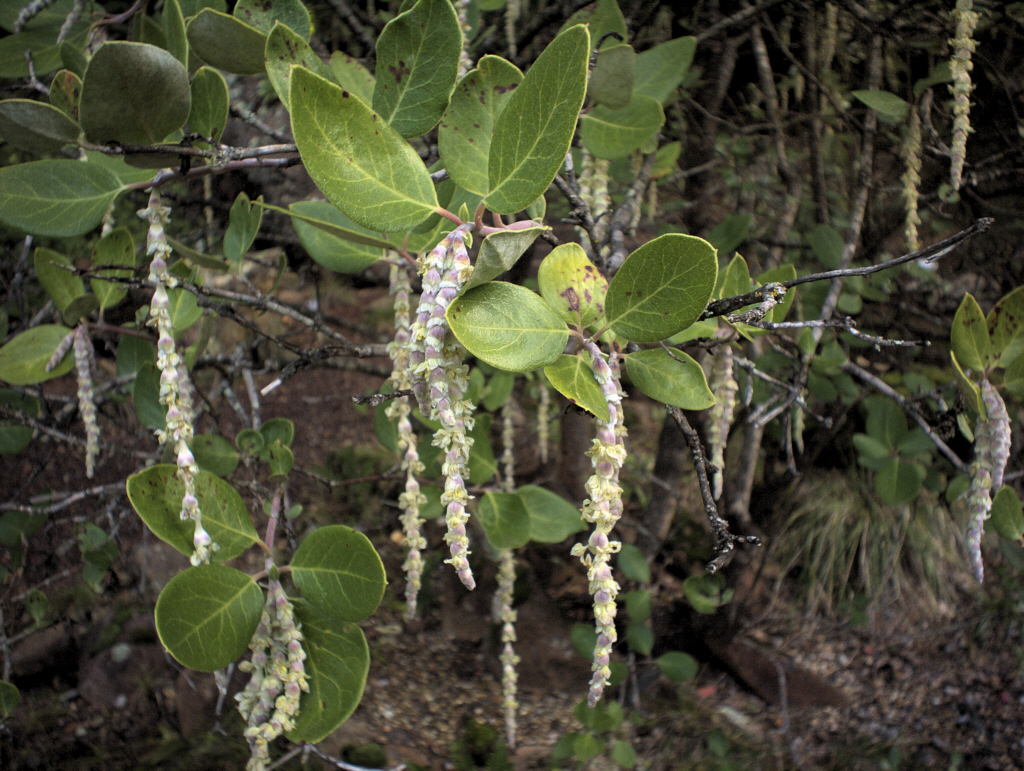
Garrya veatchii

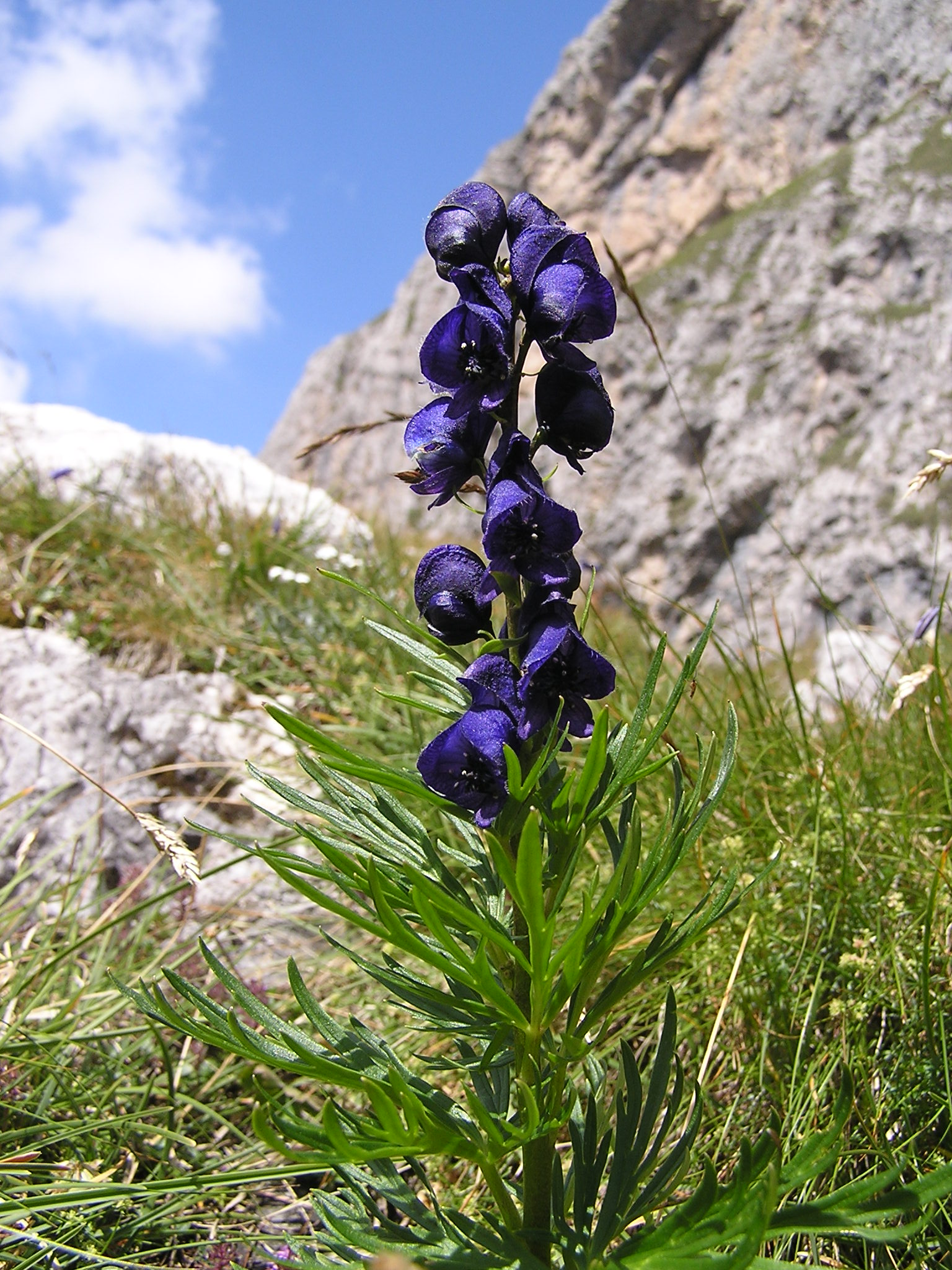
Aconitum napellus

Diterpene alkaloids are natural products of the terpene alkaloid type.

== Occurrence ==
Veatchine is found in the bark of Garrya veatchii, a member of the Cup Catkins family. Aconitine is the main alkaloid in aconite.

== Structure ==
Diterpene alkaloids can be divided into two groups: The diterpene alkaloids, characterized by a C20 parent body, and the norditerpene alkaloids, which are based on a hexacyclic C19 parent body.

== Representatives ==
=== Diterpene group ===
Among the C20 alkaloids is the atisine-type (atisine, hetidine, hetisine) and the veatchine-type (Veatchin, Napellin).

Atisine

Veatchin

=== Northern iterpene group ===
The C19 alkaloids include, among others, the aconitine type (aconitine, delphinine) and the lycoctonine type (Lycoctonin, Browniin).

(+)-Lycoctonine

== Properties ==
Aconitine has cardiac arrhythmic and antipyretic properties and is one of the most toxic plant compounds.
