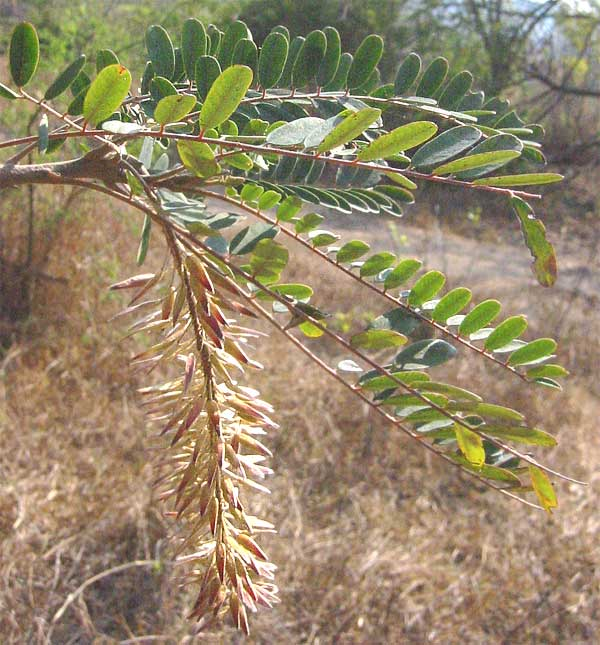

Conservation status
- Least Concern (IUCN 3.1)

Scientific classification
- Kingdom: Plantae
- Clade: Tracheophytes
- Clade: Angiosperms
- Clade: Eudicots
- Clade: Rosids
- Order: Picramniales
- Family: Picramniaceae
- Genus: Alvaradoa
- Species: A. amorphoides

Binomial name
- Alvaradoa amorphoides Liebm.

= Alvaradoa amorphoides =

Mexican alvaradoa

Species of tree

Alvaradoa amorphoides, the Mexican alvaradoa, is a species of plant in the Picramniaceae family. It is a common native plant in Mexico but is also native to southern Florida, where is it endangered.
