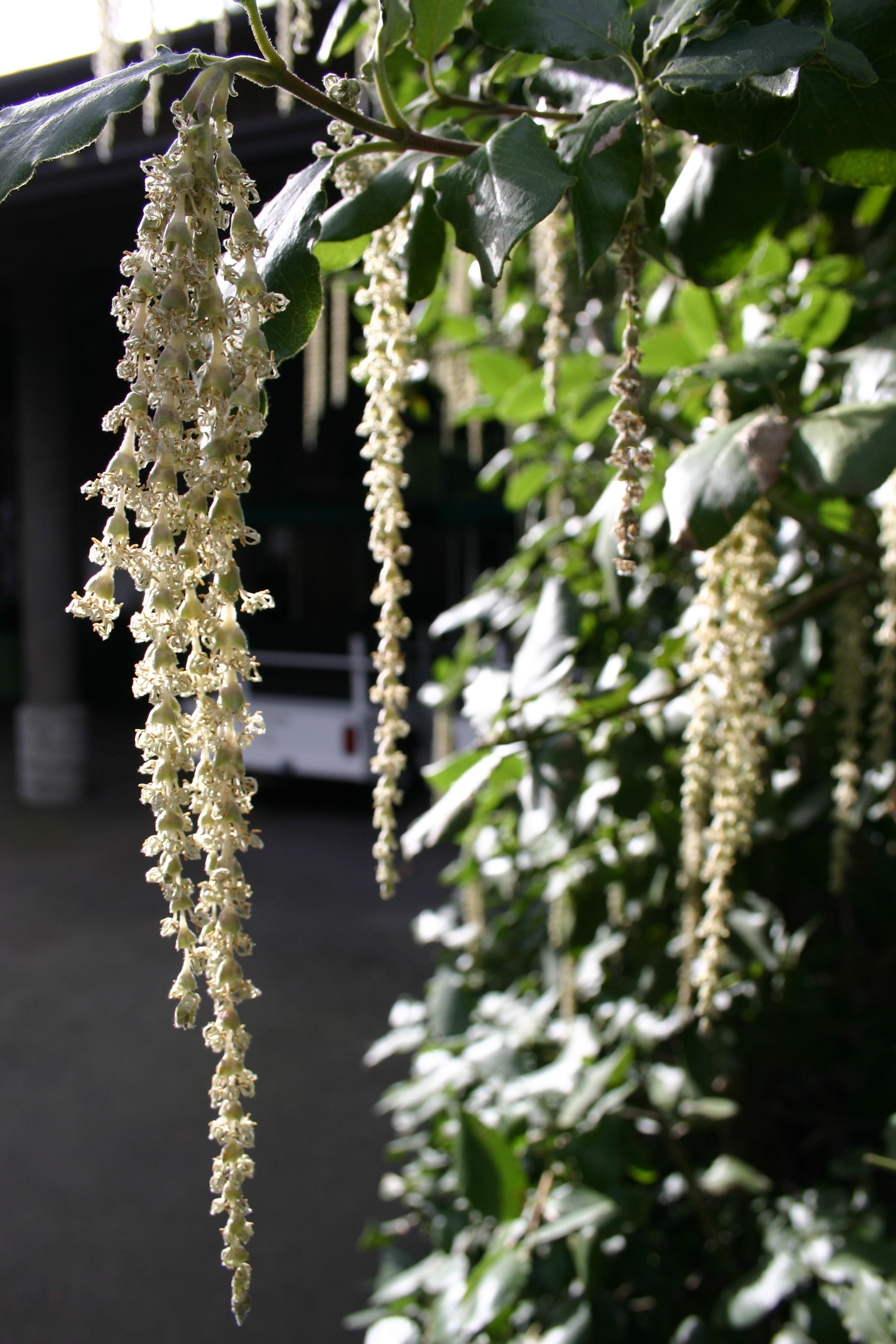
- Garrya catkins in February at Woodland Park Zoo in Seattle, Washington.

Scientific classification
- Kingdom: Plantae
- Clade: Tracheophytes
- Clade: Angiosperms
- Clade: Eudicots
- Clade: Asterids
- Order: Garryales
- Family: Garryaceae
- Genus: Garrya; Douglas ex Lindl.

Synonyms
- Fadyenia Endl.

= Garrya =

Genus of plants

Garrya is a genus of flowering plants in the family Garryaceae native to Mexico, the western United States, Central America and the Greater Antilles. Common names include silk tassel and tassel bush.

== Description ==
They are evergreen dioecious wind-pollinated shrubs growing to 1–5 m (3–16 ft) tall. The leaves are arranged in opposite pairs, and are simple, leathery, dark green to gray-green, ovate, 3–15 cm (1–6 in) long, with an entire margin and a short petiole. The flowers are gray-green catkins, short and spreading when first produced in late summer; the male catkins becoming long (3–20 cm (1–8 in)) and pendulous in late winter when shedding pollen; the female catkins usually a little shorter and less pendulous. The fruit is a round dry berry containing two seeds.

== Species ==
- Garrya buxifolia – dwarf silktassel; western Oregon, northern California
- Garrya congdonii – chaparral silktassel; California
- Garrya corvorum – Guatemala
- Garrya elliptica – coast silktassel, wavyleaf silktassel; western Oregon, western California
- Garrya fadyenii – Fadyen's silktassel; Cuba, Jamaica, Hispaniola; naturalised in Leeward Islands
- Garrya flavescens – ashy silktassel; California and Baja California, northeast to Utah and New Mexico
- Garrya fremontii – bearbrush silktassel; southern Washington, Oregon, California, northwestern Nevada
- Garrya glaberrima – Coahuila, Tamaulipas, Nuevo León
- Garrya goldmannii – southeastern New Mexico, southwestern Texas, and northeastern Mexico
- Garrya grisea – Baja California
- Garrya laurifolia – laurelleaf silktassel; widespread from Chihuahua and Tamaulipas south to Panama
- Garrya lindheimeri – southwestern Texas and northeastern Mexico
- Garrya longifolia – Durango, Jalisco, Guerrero, Michoacán, Oaxaca, Morelos, Mexico State, Distrito Federal de México
- Garrya mexicana – southern Nuevo León
- Garrya ovata – eggleaf silktassel; New Mexico, Texas, Chihuahua, Oaxaca
- Garrya salicifolia – willowleaf silktassel; Baja California, Baja California Sur
- Garrya veatchii – canyon silktassel; California, Baja California
- Garrya wrightii – Wright's silktassel; Arizona, New Mexico, Texas, Chihuahua, Sonora, Durango, Coahuila

== Cultivation and uses ==
Some species, notably Garrya elliptica, are widely cultivated in gardens for their foliage and the catkins produced in late winter. They are frequently grown against a wall, or as a windbreak in coastal areas. Male plants are more widely grown, as their catkins are longer and more attractive; one such cultivar, G. elliptica 'James Roof', has catkins up to 35 cm (14 in) long. The hybrids G. × issaquahensis (G. elliptica × G. fremontii) and G. × thuretii (G. elliptica × G. fadyenii) have been bred for garden planting.
