= Picramnia parvifolia =

Scientific classification
- Kingdom: Plantae
- Clade: Tracheophytes
- Clade: Angiosperms
- Clade: Eudicots
- Clade: Rosids
- Order: Picramniales
- Family: Picramniaceae
- Genus: Picramnia
- Species: P. parvifolia

Binomial name
- Picramnia parvifolia Engl.

Synonyms
- Picramnia regnellii Engl.

Species of tree

Picramnia parvifolia, the cedrinho, is a tree species that occurs in Brazil (in Cerrado and Atlantic Forest), in the regions Sudeste (in São Paulo and Minas Gerais states) and Sul (Paraná, Santa Catarina and Rio Grande do Sul state), and in Paraguay (in the departments of Guairá and Paraguarí).
