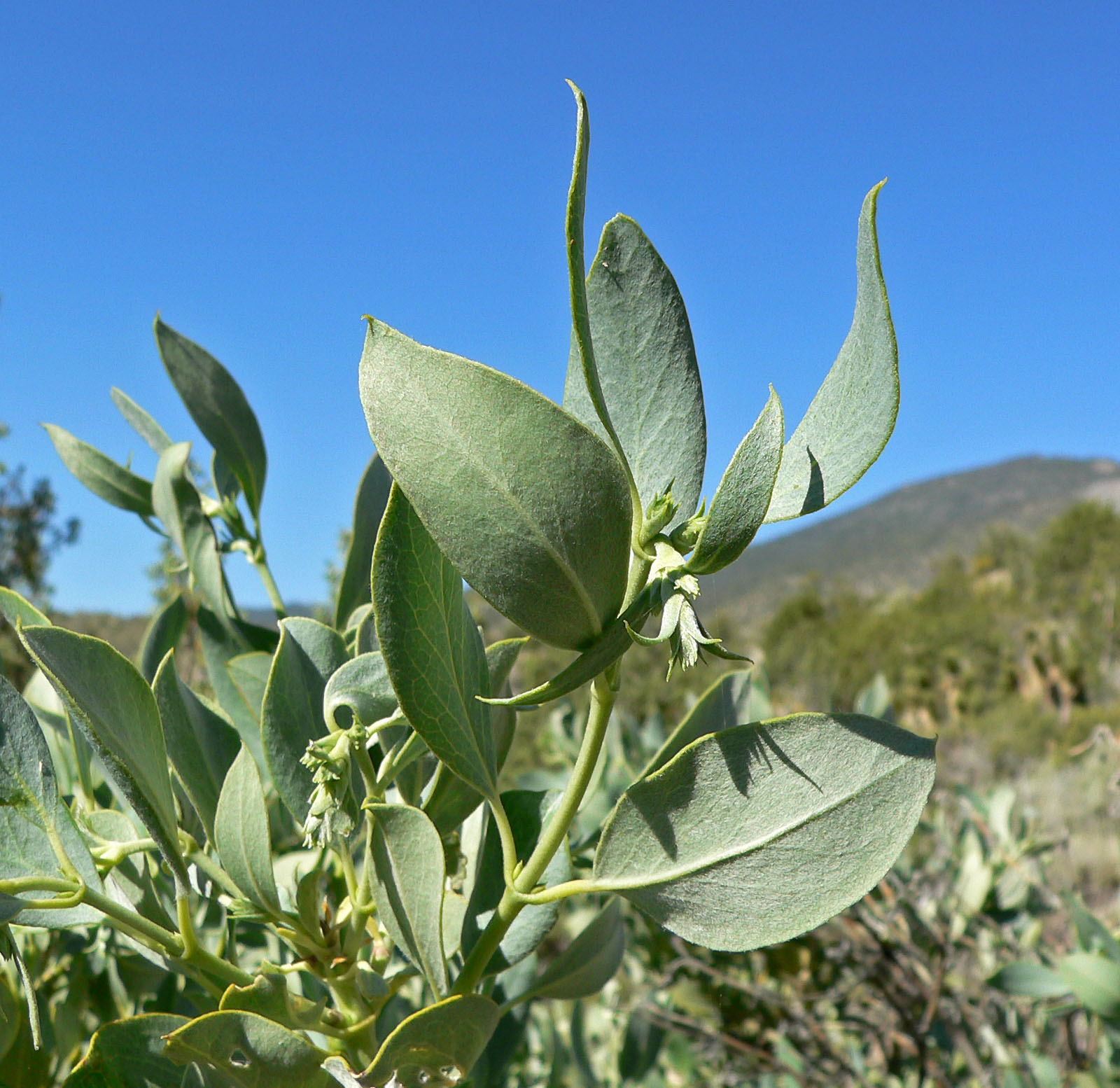

Conservation status
- Least Concern (IUCN 3.1)

Scientific classification
- Kingdom: Plantae
- Clade: Embryophytes
- Clade: Tracheophytes
- Clade: Angiosperms
- Clade: Eudicots
- Clade: Asterids
- Order: Garryales
- Family: Garryaceae
- Genus: Garrya
- Species: G. flavescens

Binomial name
- Garrya flavescens S.Watson

Synonyms
- Garrya congdonii Eastw.; Garrya flavescens subsp. congdonii (Eastw.) Dahling; Garrya flavescens var. pallida (Eastw.) Bacig. ex Ewan; Garrya flavescens subsp. pallida (Eastw.) Dahling; Garrya flavescens var. venosa Jeps.; Garrya mollis Greene; Garrya pallida Eastw.; Garrya veatchii var. flavescens (S.Watson) J.M.Coult. & W.H.Evans

= Garrya flavescens =

Species of plant

Garrya flavescens is a species of flowering shrub, known by the common name ashy silktassel.

The plant is native to the southwestern United States, and Baja California, Sonora, and Chihuahua in northern Mexico. It grows in many habitats, including dry forest, desert, and chaparral.

== Description ==
Garrya flavescens is a shrub reaching a maximum height approaching three meters.

The leaves are oval-shaped, up to 7 or 8 centimeters long and about half as wide. The underside may be hairless to very hairy and pale dusty gray.

The plant is dioecious, with both male and female plants producing long hanging clusters of flowers. Female flowers give way to bunches or clusters of spherical berries covered in hairs.

== See also ==
- Madrean Sky Islands — desert habitat of the plant.
