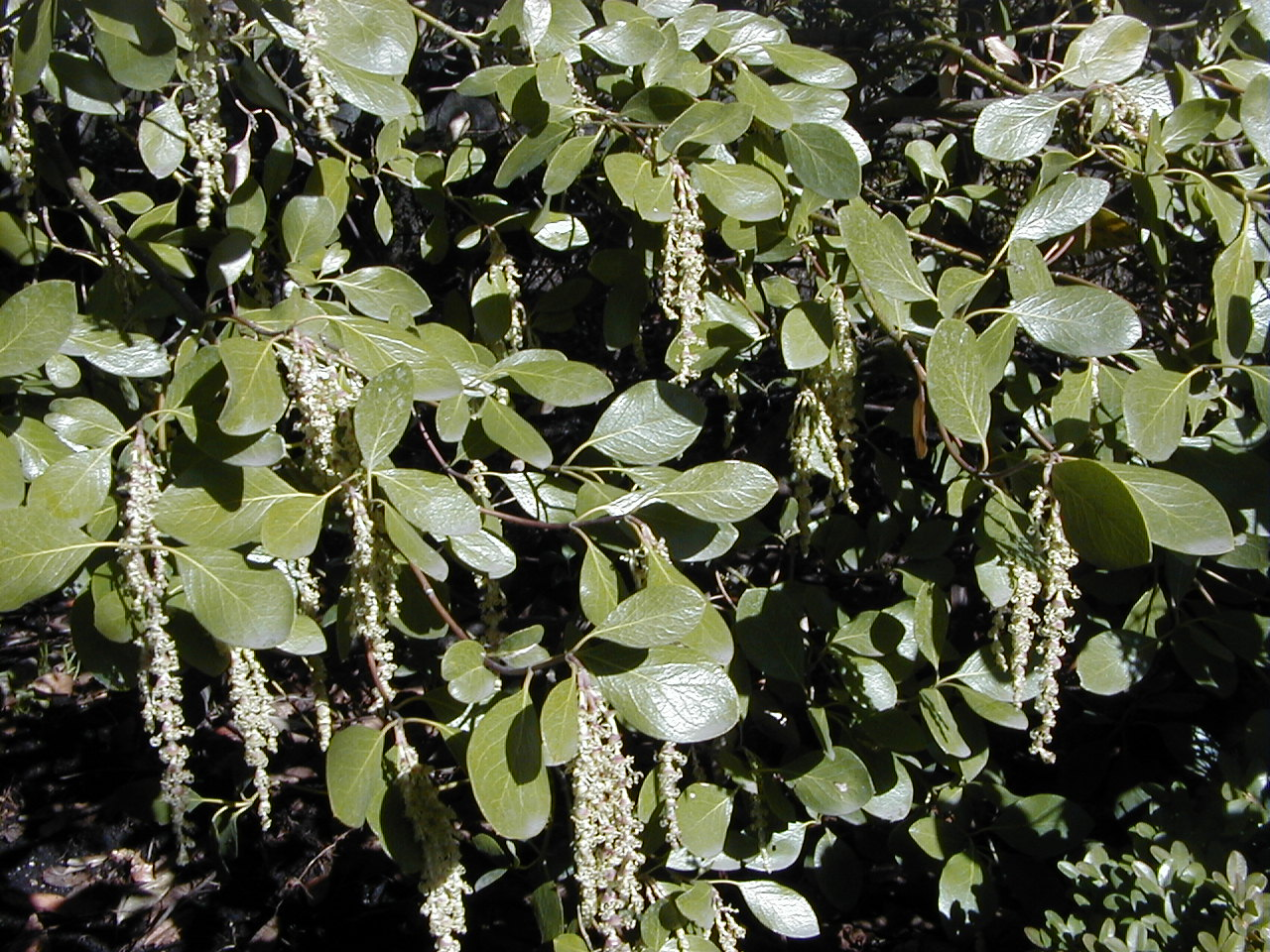

Conservation status
- Least Concern (IUCN 3.1)

Scientific classification
- Kingdom: Plantae
- Clade: Embryophytes
- Clade: Tracheophytes
- Clade: Angiosperms
- Clade: Eudicots
- Clade: Asterids
- Order: Garryales
- Family: Garryaceae
- Genus: Garrya
- Species: G. fremontii

Binomial name
- Garrya fremontii Torr.

Synonyms
- Garrya fremontii var. laxa Eastw.; Garrya rigida Eastw.

= Garrya fremontii =

Species of plant

Garrya fremontii is a species of flowering shrub known by several common names, including California fever bush, bearbrush, and Frémont's silktassel. Both the latter name, and the plant's specific epithet are derived from John C. Frémont.

== Distribution ==
The plant is native to the West coast of the United States, from Washington to California. It can be found in a number of habitats, from mountain forest to woodlands and chaparral canyons and slopes.

== Description ==
Garrya fremontii is a shrub reaching a maximum height of three to four meters. The leaves are oval-shaped, 2 to 12 centimeters long and about half as wide, and smooth green, rarely with hairs on the undersides.

The plant is dioecious, with male and female plants producing long, hanging clusters of yellowish to pinkish flowers.

The fruit is a spherical berry, starting green and turning pink and then purple. The fruit is eaten by birds and mammals, who disperse the seeds.

The plant can also sprout from its root crown. Like many other chaparral species, it is quick to recover from wildfire.
