= Northern coastal scrub =

Northern coastal scrub is a diverse scrubland plant community found along the Pacific Coast from Northern California to Southern Oregon, as well as some offshore islands. It frequently forms a landscape mosaic with coastal prairie.

== Description ==
Northern coastal scrub is found on various rocky coastal land forms along the Pacific Coast. It is observed as either patchy ocean-side cover near coastal prairie or a dense and continuous shrub cover over perennial herbaceous plants. Northern coastal scrub will form a landscape mosaic with coastal prairie on sites with thicker, more moist soil.

The conditions are harsh, with high exposure to wind and salt deposition and generally low-quality soil. The vegetation of coastal scrub communities is mostly composed of resilient short shrubs with flexible branches growing from a rigid, woody base.

=== Climate ===
Northern coastal scrub and coastal prairie generally occur where the Pacific Ocean moderates summer drought. As a result, northern coastal scrub not only traces the Pacific Coastline from central California to Southern Oregon, but extends inland, following the distribution of marine climate influence, appearing where the winds press coastal fog inland.

=== Salinity and species diversity ===
Both coastal prairies and scrubs have high species diversity. The northern coastal scrub is specifically associated with 106 rare/endangered plant taxa, with 79 of those species being endemic to California. It is noted that the closer a community is to the coast, the more diverse it is. This diversity is likely owed in a large part to the harsh conditions of the environment as they force plants to make adaptations in order to retain a viable population. The conditions also keep the species diversity high, preventing any one species from overly proliferating. Notably, salt deposition also has a significant correlation to the kind of vegetation present, as in communities with high salt deposition, such as those located on cliff bluffs, herbaceous plants tend be more prevalent than woody ones, which were only present in more dwarfed form.

== Vegetation ==
Coastal scrub is a common plant community along the hills of the California coast. The northern coastal scrub's predominant plants are low evergreen shrubs and herbs. Particularly Characteristic shrubs include coyote brush (Baccharis pilularis), California yerba santa (Eriodictyon californicum), coast silk-tassel (Garrya elliptica), salal (Gaultheria shallon), and yellow bush lupine (Lupinus arboreus). Herbaceous Northern coastal scrub species include western blue-eyed grass (Sisyrinchium bellum), Douglas iris (Iris douglasiana), and native grasses. However, no single species is typical of all coastal Scrub communities, as the compositions varies greatly along the coastline. As the conditions become progressively drier moving north to south, the species composition shifts from being dominated by evergreen species to drought-deciduous species. Within the northern coastal scrub communities, there are two main types: the more uncommon type occurs on exposed ocean-side areas as short patches of bush lupine and many-colored lupine. The more common type occurs in less exposed areas and is dominated by coyote bush.

=== Fire ===
Fire was a common feature of many California landscapes prior to Western settlement, whether as a result of Indigenous land management practice or natural causes such as lightning. It is difficult to determine how common fire was in northern coastal scrub as most techniques used to determine historic frequency of fire cannot be applied to scrub vegetation. While northern coastal scrub communities are able to easily establish themselves after a fire, especially after low intensity fires, it undeniably has a significant impact on the composition of these plant communities. There are certain species which sprout and spread more quickly after low intensity fires which will then dominate the landscape until other plants are able to establish themselves. In general, the resilience of Coastal scrub may cause plants to occupy areas that have been stripped by fire or landslides. Most times the original plants will eventually reoccupy the area, but this tendency has become problematic for coastal prairie. While both northern coastal scrub and coastal prairie have increasingly become more rare due to human development in past years, coastal prairie has seen a more significant decline. This decline is largely owed to a combination of fire, lack of grazing, and coastal scrub, as the former two create allow the more resilient coastal scrub to invade the grasslands without moderation.

== See also ==
- Coastal sage scrub
- California coastal prairie
- California coastal sage and chaparral ecoregion
- Native grasses of California
