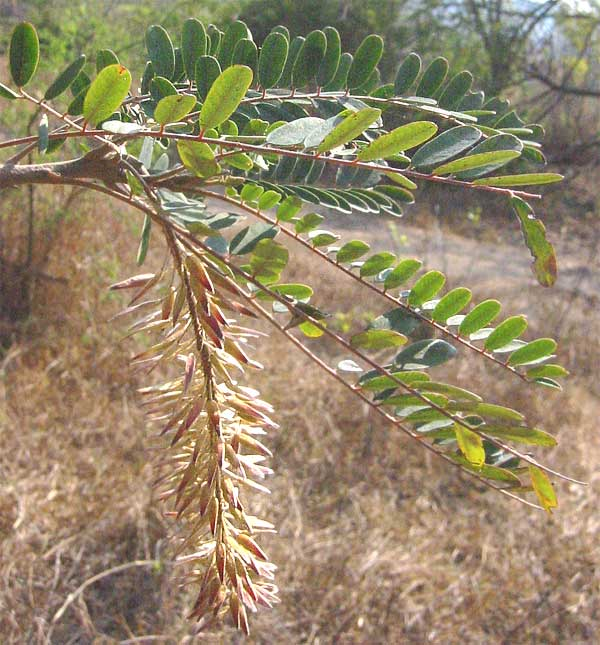
- Alvaradoa amorphoides

Scientific classification
- Kingdom: Plantae
- Clade: Tracheophytes
- Clade: Angiosperms
- Clade: Eudicots
- Clade: Rosids
- Order: Picramniales
- Family: Picramniaceae
- Genus: Alvaradoa; Liebm.

= Alvaradoa =

Genus of flowering plants

Alvaradoa is a genus of plants in the family Picramniaceae.

It contains the following species of shrubs or small trees:

1. Alvaradoa amorphoides Liebm.
2. Alvaradoa arborescens Griseb.
3. Alvaradoa haitiensis Urb.
4. Alvaradoa jamaicensis Benth.
5. Alvaradoa lewisii R.A.Howard & Proctor
6. Alvaradoa subovata Cronquist
