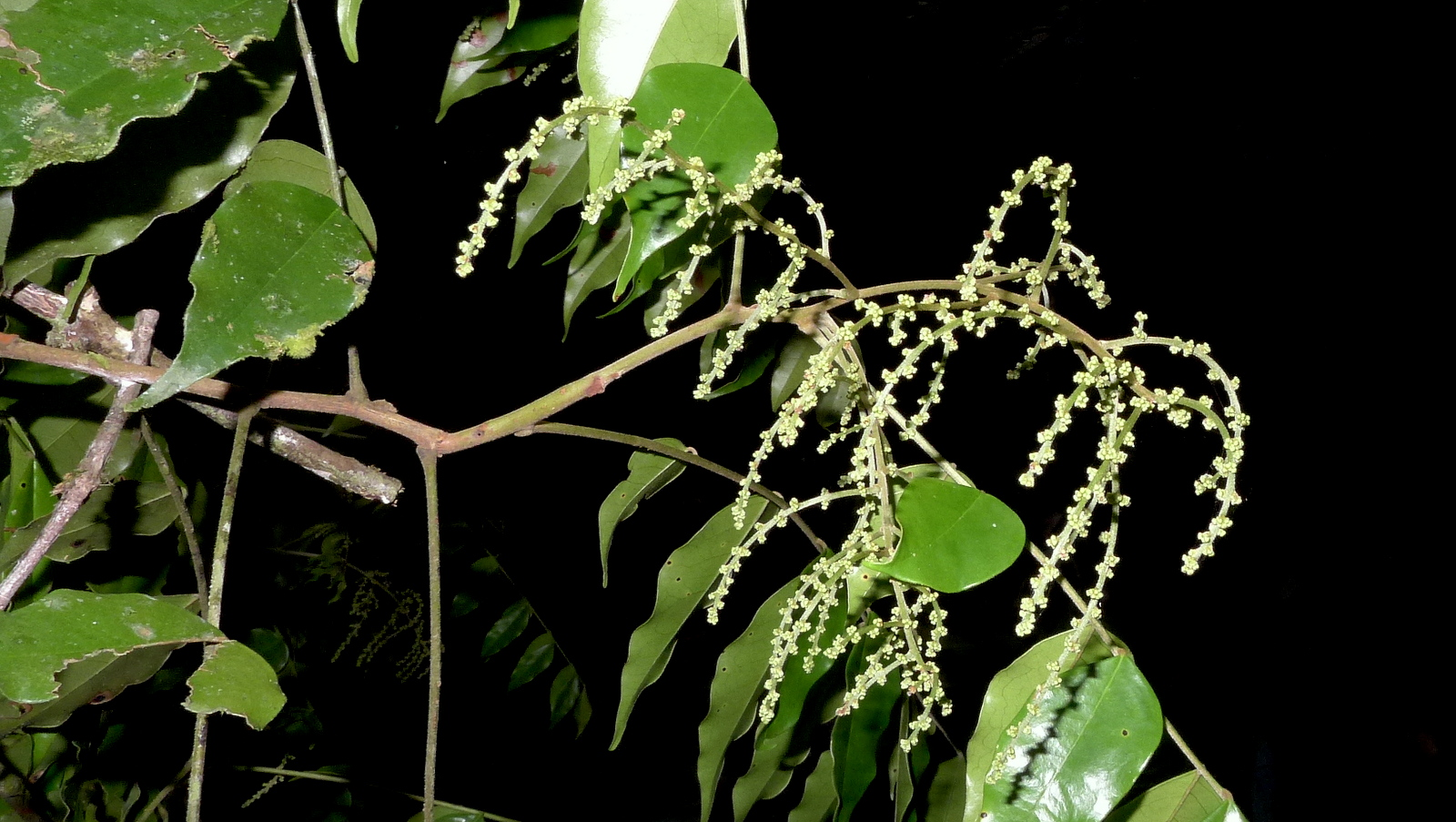
- Picrama glazioviana

Scientific classification
- Kingdom: Plantae
- Clade: Tracheophytes
- Clade: Angiosperms
- Clade: Eudicots
- Clade: Rosids
- Order: Picramniales
- Family: Picramniaceae
- Genus: Picramnia; Sw. (1788)

Type species
- Picramnia antidesma Sw.

Synonyms
- Brasiliastrum Lam. (1785); Casabitoa Alain (1980); Gumillea Ruiz & Pav. (1794); Pseudo-brasilium Plum. ex Adans. (1763); Tariri Aubl. (1775)

= Picramnia =

Genus of flowering plants

Picramnia, the bitterbushes, is a genus of flowering plants generally placed in the family Picramniaceae, but sometimes included in Simaroubaceae. The name is conserved against the genera Pseudo-brasilium Adans., and Tariri Aubl., both which have been rejected (nomen rejiciendum).

== Species ==
44 species are accepted.

- Picramnia andrade-limae Pirani
- Picramnia antidesma Sw.
- Picramnia apetala Tul.
- Picramnia bahiensis Turcz.
- Picramnia bullata W.W.Thomas
- Picramnia campestris Rizzini & Occhioni
- Picramnia caracasana Engl.
- Picramnia ciliata Mart.
- Picramnia coccinea W.W.Thomas
- Picramnia deflexa W.W.Thomas
- Picramnia dictyoneura (Urb.) Urb. & Ekman
- Picramnia dolichobotrya Diels
- Picramnia elliptica Kuhlm. ex Pirani & W.W.Thomas
- Picramnia emarginata Urb. & Ekman
- Picramnia excelsa Kuhlm. ex Pirani
- Picramnia ferrea Pirani & W.W.Thomas
- Picramnia gardneri Planch.
- Picramnia glazioviana Engl.
- Picramnia gracilis Tul.
- Picramnia grandifolia Engl.
- Picramnia guerrerensis W.W.Thomas
- Picramnia guianensis (Aubl.) Jans.-Jac.
- Picramnia hirsuta W.W.Thomas
- Picramnia juniniana J.F.Macbr.
- Picramnia killipii J.F.Macbr.
- Picramnia latifolia Tul.
- Picramnia macrocarpa Urb. & Ekman
- Picramnia magnifolia J.F.Macbr.
- Picramnia matudae Lundell
- Picramnia nuriensis Steyerm.
- Picramnia oreadica Pirani
- Picramnia parvifolia Engl.
- Picramnia pentandra Sw.
- Picramnia polyantha (Benth.) Planch.
- Picramnia ramiflora Planch.
- Picramnia reticulata Griseb.
- Picramnia sellowii Planch.
- Picramnia sphaerocarpa Planch.
- Picramnia spruceana Engl.
- Picramnia teapensis Tul.
- Picramnia thomasii Gonz.-Martínez & J.Jiménez Ram.
- Picramnia tumbesina Cornejo
- Picramnia villosa Rusby
- Picramnia xalapensis Planch.

== See also ==
- Gumillea, for more information on this synonym of Picramnia.
