= Argentation chromatography =

Argentation chromatography is chromatography using a stationary phase that contains silver salts. Silver-containing stationary phases are well suited for separating organic compounds on the basis of the number and type of alkene groups. The technique is employed for gas chromatography and various types of liquid chromatography, including thin layer chromatography. Analytes containing alkene groups elute more slowly than the analogous compounds lacking alkenes. Separations are also sensitive to the type of alkene. The technique is especially useful in the analysis of fats and fatty acids, which are well known to exist in both saturated and unsaturated (alkene-containing) forms. For example, trans fats, undesirable contaminants in ultra-processed foods, are quantified by argentation chromatography.

== Theory ==
Silver ions form alkene complexes. The binding is reversible, but sufficient to impede the elution of the alkene-containing analytes.

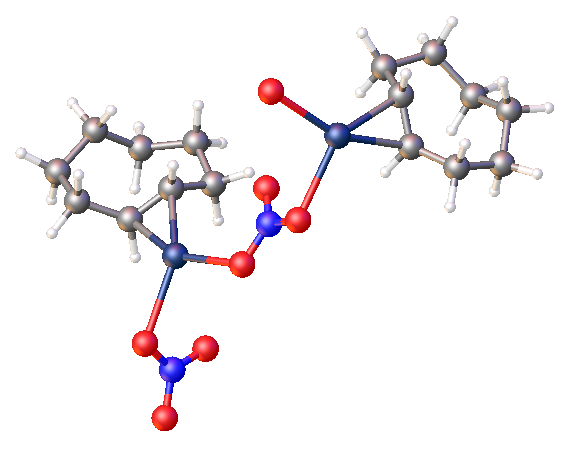
Structure of the complex of silver nitrate and trans-cyclooctene. Color code: red = O, bright blue = N, dark blue = Ag, gray = C, white = H.
