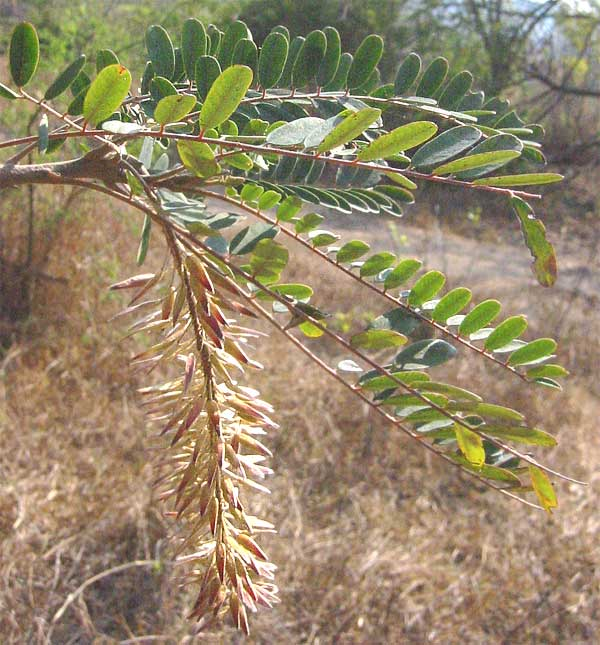
- Alvaradoa amorphoides

Scientific classification
- Kingdom: Plantae
- Clade: Tracheophytes
- Clade: Angiosperms
- Clade: Eudicots
- Clade: Rosids
- Order: Picramniales; Doweld
- Family: Picramniaceae; Fernando & Quinn

Genera
- Aenigmanu W.W.Thomas; Alvaradoa Liebm.; Nothotalisia W.W.Thomas; Picramnia Sw.

= Picramniaceae =

Family of flowering plants

Picramniaceae is a small, mainly neotropical family of four genera Aenigmanu, Alvaradoa, Nothotalisia and Picramnia. The family is the only member of the order Picramniales. Members of the family were formerly placed in the family Simaroubaceae or misidentified as species in the family Sapindaceae, in the order Sapindales. The most recent standard classification of the Angiosperms (the APG III system) distinguishes it as a separate family and order. It belongs to the malvids (eurosids II), one of the three groups that constitute the rosids.

Four genera are accepted:

- Aenigmanu W.W.Thomas – 1 species, Peru and northwestern Brazil
- Alvaradoa Liebm. – 6 species, Mexico and Florida to central South America
- Nothotalisia W.W.Thomas – 3 species, Panama to Bolivia and northern Brazil
- Picramnia Sw. – 44 species, Mexico and Florida to northeastern Argentina

In 2021, a new genus was identified from materials collected almost 50 years prior. It was discovered by Robert Foster in 1973, but no scientist was able to identify it. It is named Aenigmanu for the enigma it originally presented to researchers.

== Characteristics ==
The occurrence of tariric acid as the major fatty acid is typical for the Picramniaceae.
