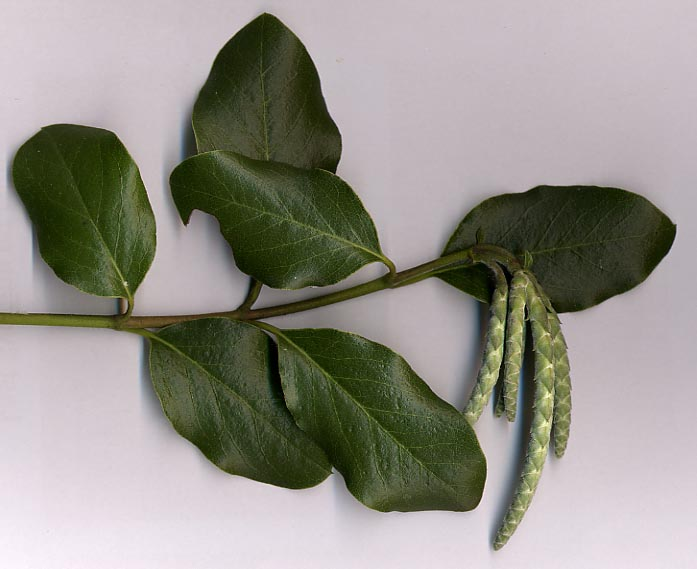
- Garrya elliptica foliage and catkins

Scientific classification
- Kingdom: Plantae
- Clade: Tracheophytes
- Clade: Angiosperms
- Clade: Eudicots
- Clade: Asterids
- Order: Garryales
- Family: Garryaceae; Lindl.

Genera
- Garrya; Aucuba

= Garryaceae =

Family of plants

Garryaceae is a small family of plants known commonly as the silktassels. It contains two genera:

- Garrya Douglas ex Lindl., 1834. About 16–18 species.
- Aucuba Thunb., 1783. About 3–10 species.

Aucuba was included in the family Cornaceae or Aucubaceae in some classification systems.

Together with Eucommia ulmoides the Garryaceae are currently placed by the Angiosperm Phylogeny Group in an own order, the Garryales.

== Chemical characteristics ==
Petroselinic acid occurs as the major fatty acid in Aucuba and Garrya species, and is also found in the families Griseliniaceae, Apiaceae and Araliaceae of the Apiales.

== Distribution ==
The family is found in warm temperate and subtropical regions, Garrya in North America, and Aucuba in eastern Asia. They are evergreen shrubs or small trees with opposite, simple leaves. While they are different in morphology, the two genera have similar phytochemistries and can be intergrafted.
