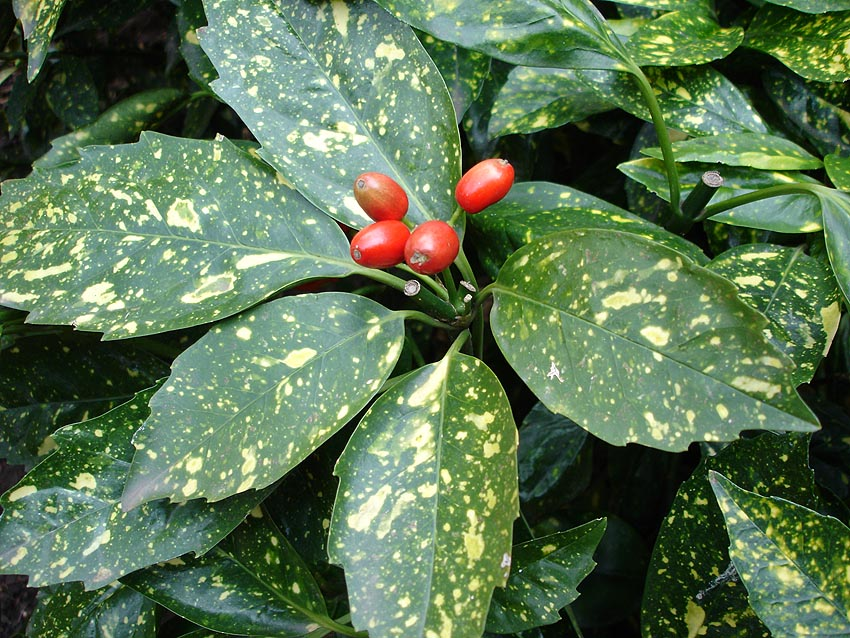
- Aucuba japonica foliage and berries

Scientific classification
- Kingdom: Plantae
- Clade: Embryophytes
- Clade: Tracheophytes
- Clade: Spermatophytes
- Clade: Angiosperms
- Clade: Eudicots
- Clade: Asterids
- Clade: Lamiids
- Order: Garryales; Lindley

Families
- Garryaceae; Eucommiaceae

= Garryales =

Order of flowering plants

The Garryales are a small order of dicotyledons, including only two families and three genera.

== Description ==
Garryales are woody plants that are either hairless or have very fine hairs. Members of the family Garryaceae are evergreen, whereas those of the Eucommiaceae are deciduous and produce latex. All members are dioecious.

== Taxonomy ==
These belong among the asterids. Under the Cronquist system, the Garryaceae were placed among the Cornales. The Eucommiaceae were given their own order and placed among the Hamamelidae. The Oncothecaceae family has been associated with Garryales, though the link is not strong enough to prove they are related.

=== Subdivisions ===
The order is made up of two families which, between them, contain three genera. These are:

- Family Garryaceae
  - Garrya
  - Aucuba
- Family Eucommiaceae
  - Eucommia

== Distribution ==
Species in the order are spread between North America and Asia. The various Garrya species are found in North America, in southern and western coastal regions of the United States. Aucuba species are found across eastern parts of Asia, while Eucommia species are within China.

== Uses ==
Plants within the Garryales may be cultivated for ornamental purposes; Aucuba japonica is grown as a decorative hedge.
