= List of Salvia species =

Salvia is the largest genus of plants in the family Lamiaceae, with the number of species estimated to range from 700 to nearly 3,000. Members include shrubs, herbaceous perennials, and annuals. There are three main regions of radiation of Salvia:

- Central and South America and Middle America and Mesoamerica, Latin America and with Africa-Eurasia and North America, (America), with approximately 600 species;
- North-Northern, Central and West-Western Asia and the Mediterranean with approx. 250 species;
- East-Eastern and South-Southern Asia and Australia and Oceania with approximately 90 species.

The naming of distinct Salvia species has undergone regular revision, with many species being renamed, merged, and reclassified over the years. Salvia officinalis (common sage), for example, has been cultivated for thousands of years, yet has been named and described under six different scientific names since 1940 alone. At one time there were over 2,000 named species and subspecies. A revision in 1988 by Gabriel Alziar of the Jardin botanique de la Ville de Nice consolidated the number of different species to approximately 700. As new discoveries are made, the taxonomic list of Salvia species will continue to change.

The first significant accounting of the genus was done by George Bentham in 1832–1836, based on a similarity in staminal morphology between Salvia members. His work, Labiatarum Genera et Species (1836), is still the most comprehensive organization of Salvia. Even though there were only 291 species at that time, he still considered the possibility of forming five or six genera, due to differences between certain groups of Salvia. Bentham eventually organized the genus into four subgenera and twelve sections, based on differences in the corolla, calyx, and stamens. In the last 100 years, that system of organization is generally not endorsed by botanists.

The classification of Salvia has long been based on the genus' unusual pollination and stamen structure, which was presumed to have evolved only once. More recently, a study using DNA sequencing of Salvia species has shown that different versions of this lever mechanism have evolved at least three different times within Salvia. This clearly makes the genus non-monophyletic, which means that members of the genus have evolved from different ancestors, rather than sharing one common ancestor. The DNA analysis has shown that the genus may consist of as many as three different clades, or branches. The study concluded that Salvia is not a natural genus—some of its branches have a closer relationship to other genera in the tribe Mentheae than to other Salvia species.

As of May 2024, Plants of the World Online accepted 1024 species, listed below.

== A ==
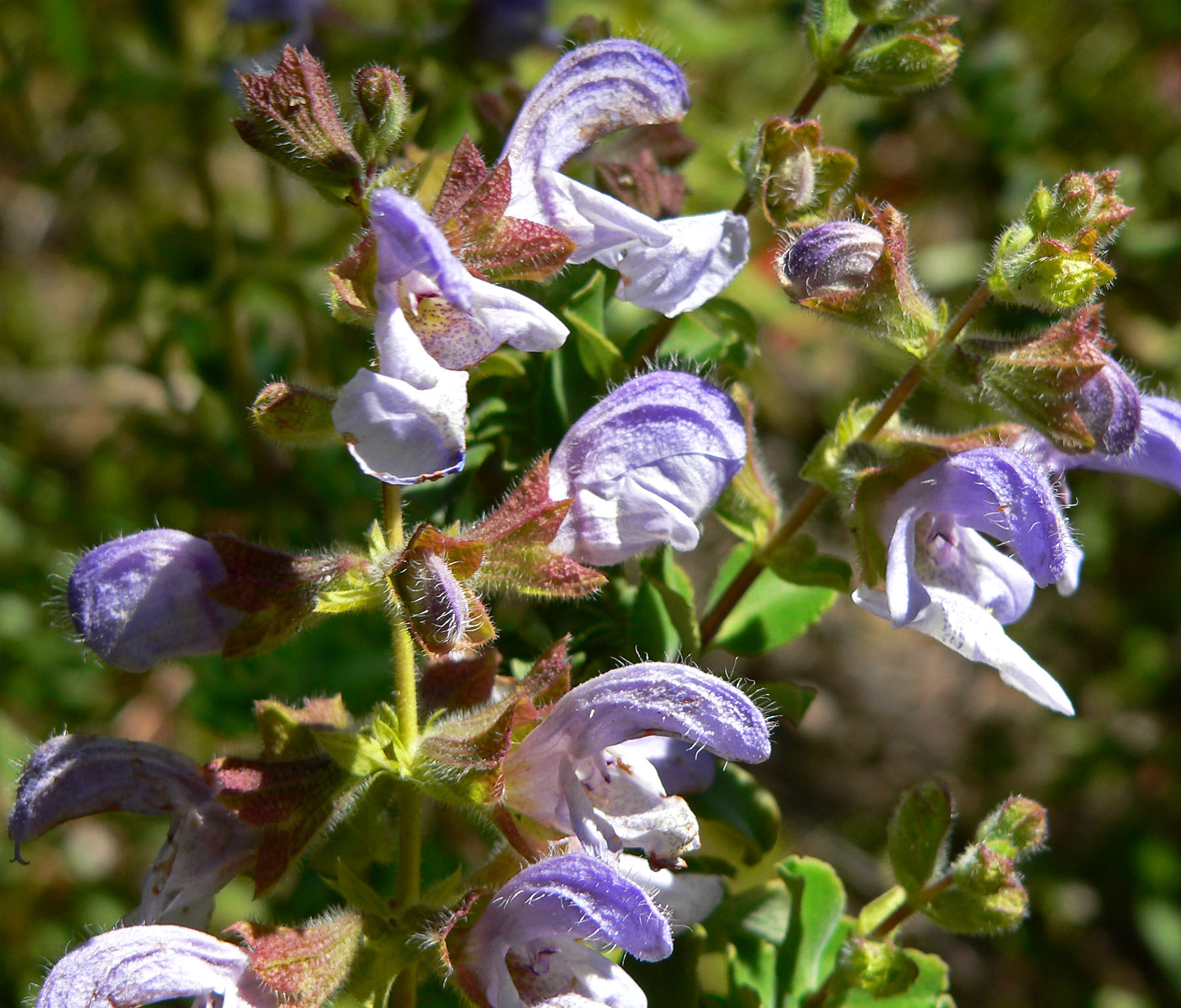
Salvia africana

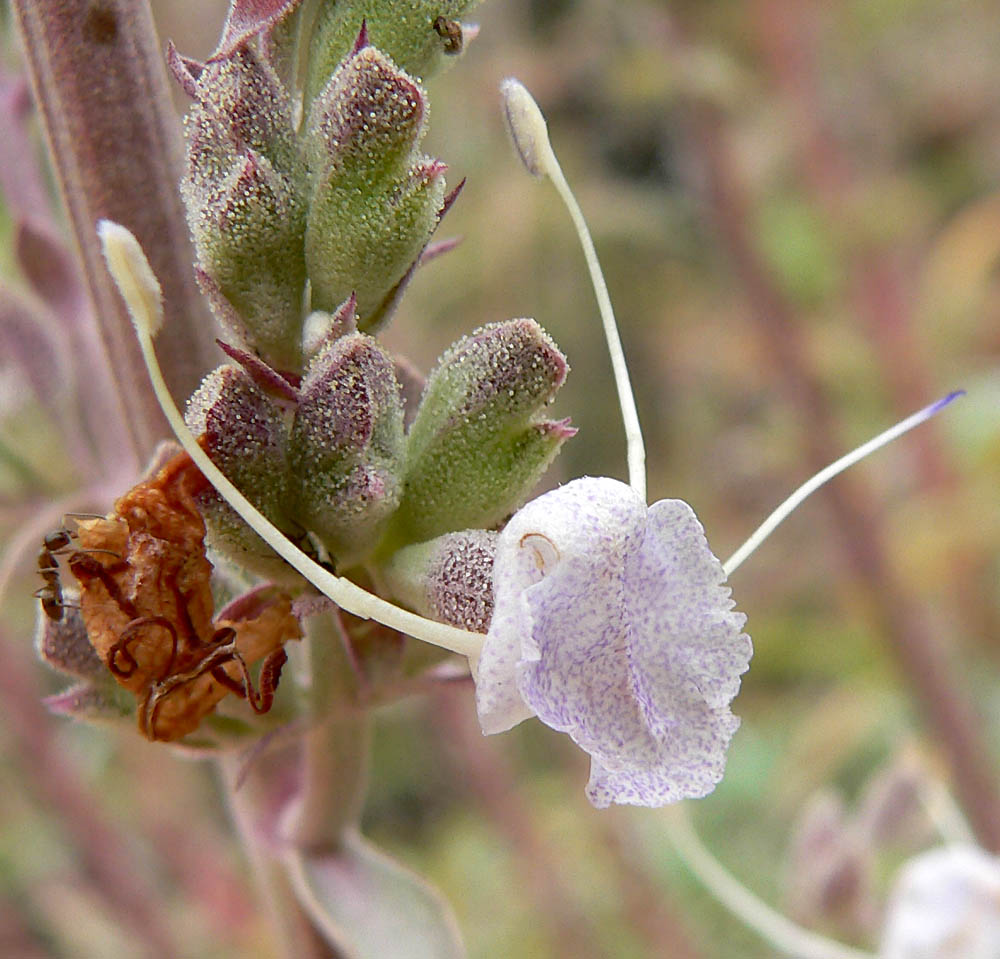
Salvia apiana

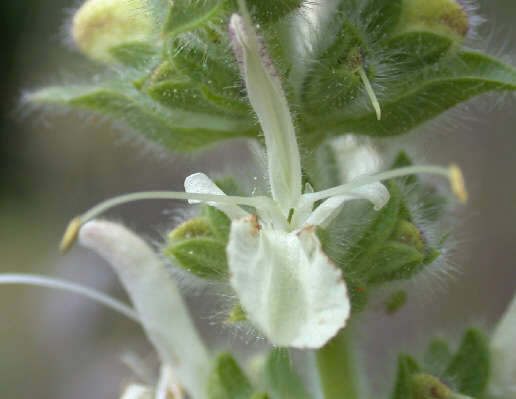
Salvia austriaca

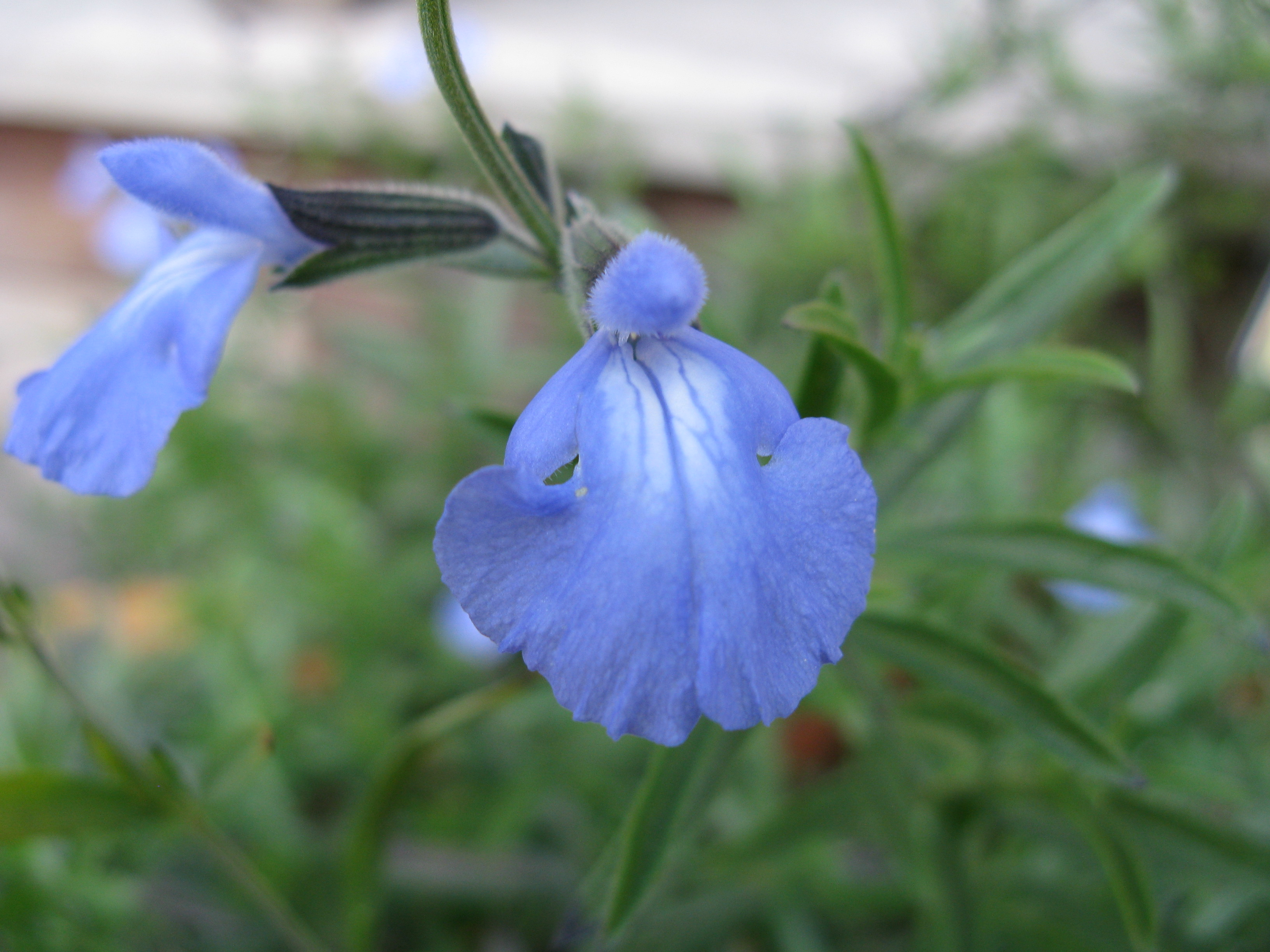
Salvia azurea

- Salvia abrotanoides (Kar.) Sytsma
- Salvia absconditiflora Greuter & Burdet
- Salvia acerifolia B.L.Turner
- Salvia acuminata Ruiz & Pav.
- Salvia adenocaulon P.H.Davis
- Salvia adenophora Fernald
- Salvia adenophylla Hedge & Hub.-Mor.
- Salvia adiantifolia E.Peter
- Salvia adiyamanensis İlçim & Tel
- Salvia adoxoides C.Y.Wu
- Salvia aegyptiaca L.
- Salvia aequidens Botsch.
- Salvia aequidistans Fernald
- Salvia aerea H.Lév.
- Salvia aethiopis L.
- Salvia africana L.
- Salvia agnes Epling
- Salvia akiensis A.Takano, Sera & N.Kurosaki
- Salvia alamosana Rose
- Salvia alata Epling
- Salvia albicalyx J.G.González
- Salvia albicaulis Benth.
- Salvia albiflora M.Martens & Galeotti
- Salvia albimaculata Hedge & Hub.-Mor.
- Salvia albiterrarum J.G.González & Art.Castro
- Salvia albocaerulea Linden
- Salvia alborosea Epling & Játiva
- Salvia alexeenkoi Pobed.
- Salvia algeriensis Desf.
- Salvia ali-askaryi S.A.Ahmad
- Salvia aliciae E.P.Santos
- Salvia altimitrata Epling
- Salvia altissima Pohl
- Salvia alvajaca Oerst.
- Salvia amethystina Sm.
- Salvia amissa Epling
- Salvia amplexicaulis Lam.
- Salvia amplicalyx E.Peter
- Salvia amplifrons Briq.
- Salvia anastomosans Ramamoorthy
- Salvia anatolica Hamzaoglu & A.Duran
- Salvia andreji Pobed.
- Salvia anguicoma Epling
- Salvia angulata Benth.
- Salvia angustiarum Epling
- Salvia apiana Jeps.
- Salvia apparicii Brade & Barb.Per.
- Salvia appendiculata E.Peter
- Salvia arabica Al-Musawi & Weinert
- Salvia aramiensis Rech.f.
- Salvia arborescens Urb. & Ekman
- Salvia arduinervis Urb. & Ekman
- Salvia arenaria A.St.-Hil. ex Benth.
- Salvia areolata Epling
- Salvia areysiana Deflers
- Salvia argentea L.
- Salvia ariana Hedge
- Salvia aridicola Briq.
- Salvia aristata Aucher ex Benth.
- Salvia arizonica A.Gray
- Salvia arthrocoma Fernald
- Salvia articulata Epling
- Salvia aspera M.Martens & Galeotti
- Salvia asperata Falc. ex Benth.
- Salvia assurgens Kunth
- Salvia atrocalyx Epling
- Salvia atrocyanea Epling
- Salvia atropaenulata Epling
- Salvia atropatana Bunge
- Salvia atropurpurea C.Y.Wu
- Salvia atrorubra C.Y.Wu
- Salvia aucheri Benth.
- Salvia aurea L.
- Salvia aurita L.f.
- Salvia austriaca Jacq.
- Salvia austromelissodora Epling & Játiva
- Salvia axillaris Moc. & Sessé ex Benth.
- Salvia axilliflora Epling
- Salvia ayavazensis Kunth
- Salvia ayecarrenoae Mart.Gord., Fragoso & de Santiago
- Salvia aytachii Vural & Adigüzel
- Salvia azurea Michx. ex Vahl

== B ==
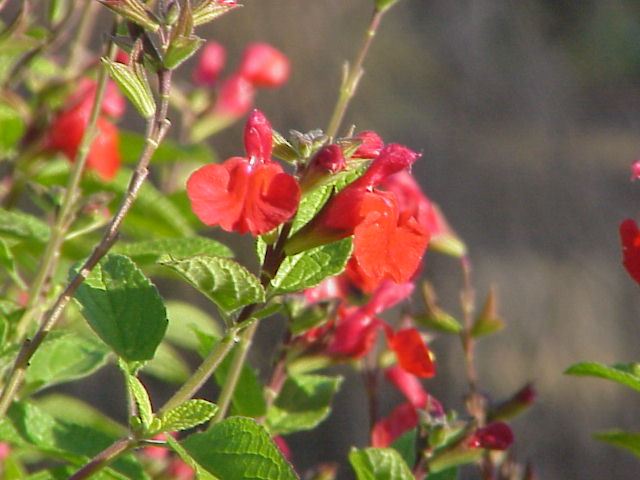
Salvia blepharophylla

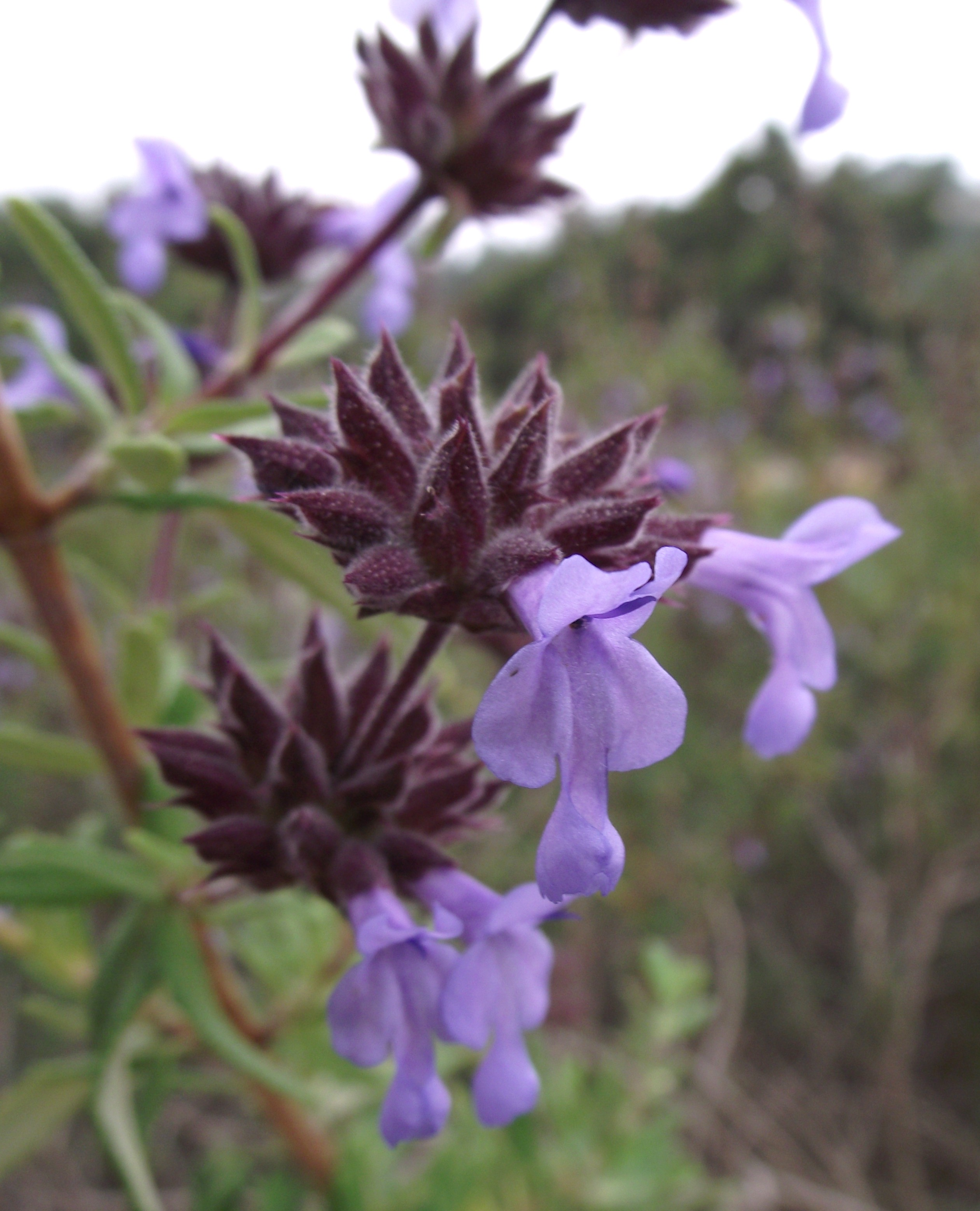
Salvia brandegeei

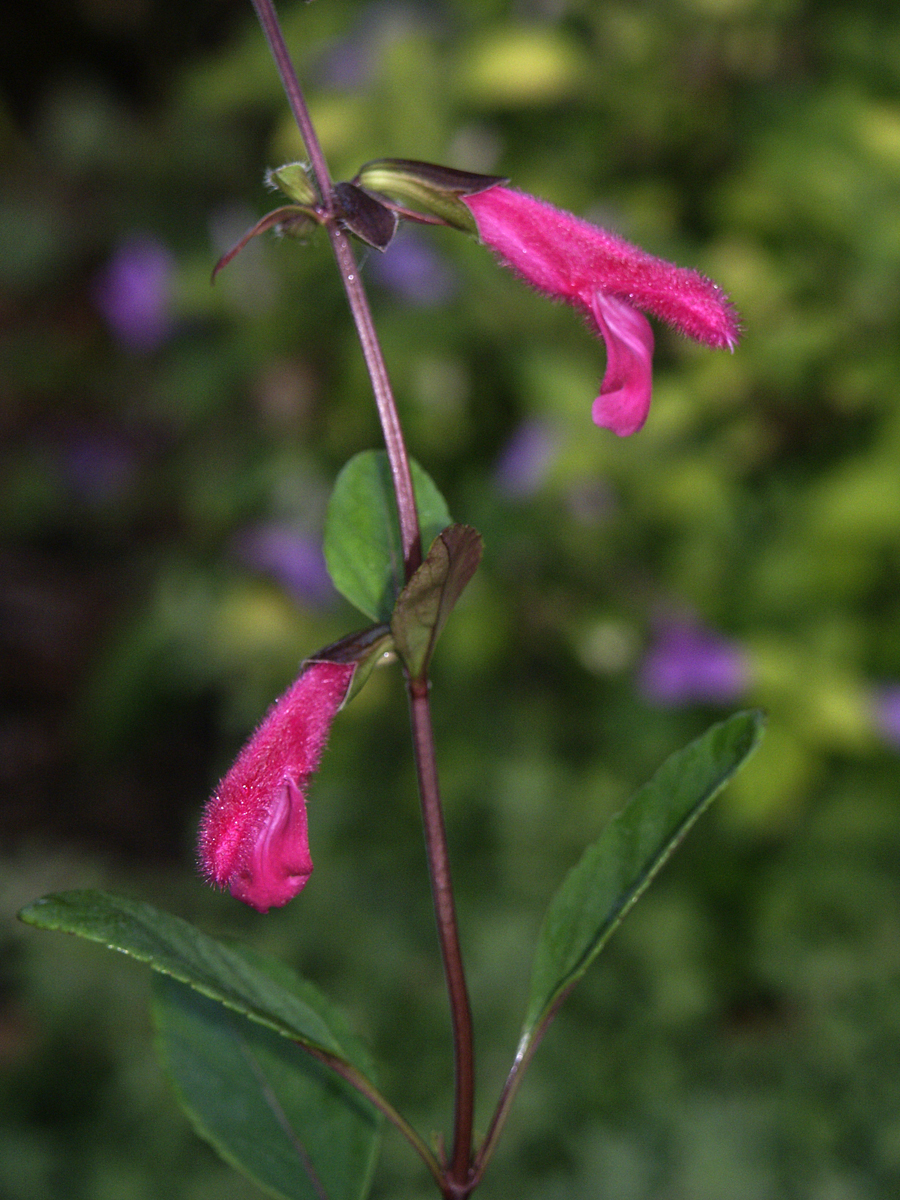
Salvia buchananii

- Salvia bahorucona Urb. & Ekman
- Salvia baimaensis S.W.Su & Z.A.Shen
- Salvia balansae Noë ex Coss.
- Salvia balaustina Pohl
- Salvia baldshuanica Lipsky
- Salvia ballotiflora Benth.
- Salvia ballsiana (Rech.f.) Hedge
- Salvia bariensis Thulin
- Salvia barrelieri Etl.
- Salvia bazmanica Rech.f. & Esfand.
- Salvia beckeri Trautv.
- Salvia beltraniorum J.G.González, Pío-León & Art.Castro
- Salvia benthamiana Gardner ex Fielding
- Salvia betulifolia Epling
- Salvia bifidocalyx C.Y.Wu & Y.C.Huang
- Salvia biserrata M.Martens & Galeotti
- Salvia blancoana Webb & Heldr.
- Salvia blepharochlaena Hedge & Hub.-Mor.
- Salvia blepharophylla Brandegee ex Epling
- Salvia boegei Ramamoorthy
- Salvia bogotensis Benth.
- Salvia booleana B.L.Turner
- Salvia bowleyana Dunn
- Salvia brachyantha (Bordz.) Pobed.
- Salvia brachyloba Urb.
- Salvia brachyloma E.Peter
- Salvia brachyodon Vandas
- Salvia brachyodonta Briq.
- Salvia brachyphylla Urb.
- Salvia bracteata Banks & Sol.
- Salvia brandegeei Munz
- Salvia breviconnectivata Y.Z.Sun ex C.Y.Wu
- Salvia breviflora Moc. & Sessé ex Benth.
- Salvia brevilabra Franch.
- Salvia brevipes Benth.
- Salvia broussonetii Benth.
- Salvia buchananii Hedge
- Salvia bucharica Popov
- Salvia buchii Urb.
- Salvia bulleyana Diels
- Salvia bullulata Benth.
- Salvia bungei J.G.González
- Salvia bupleuroides C.Presl ex Benth.

== C ==
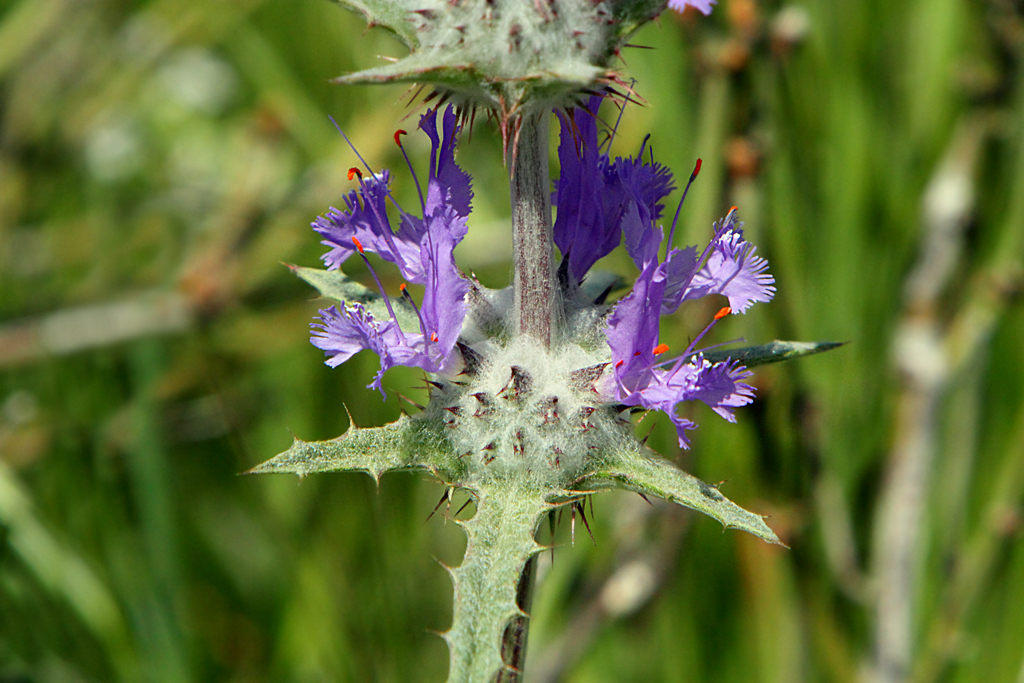
Salvia carduacea

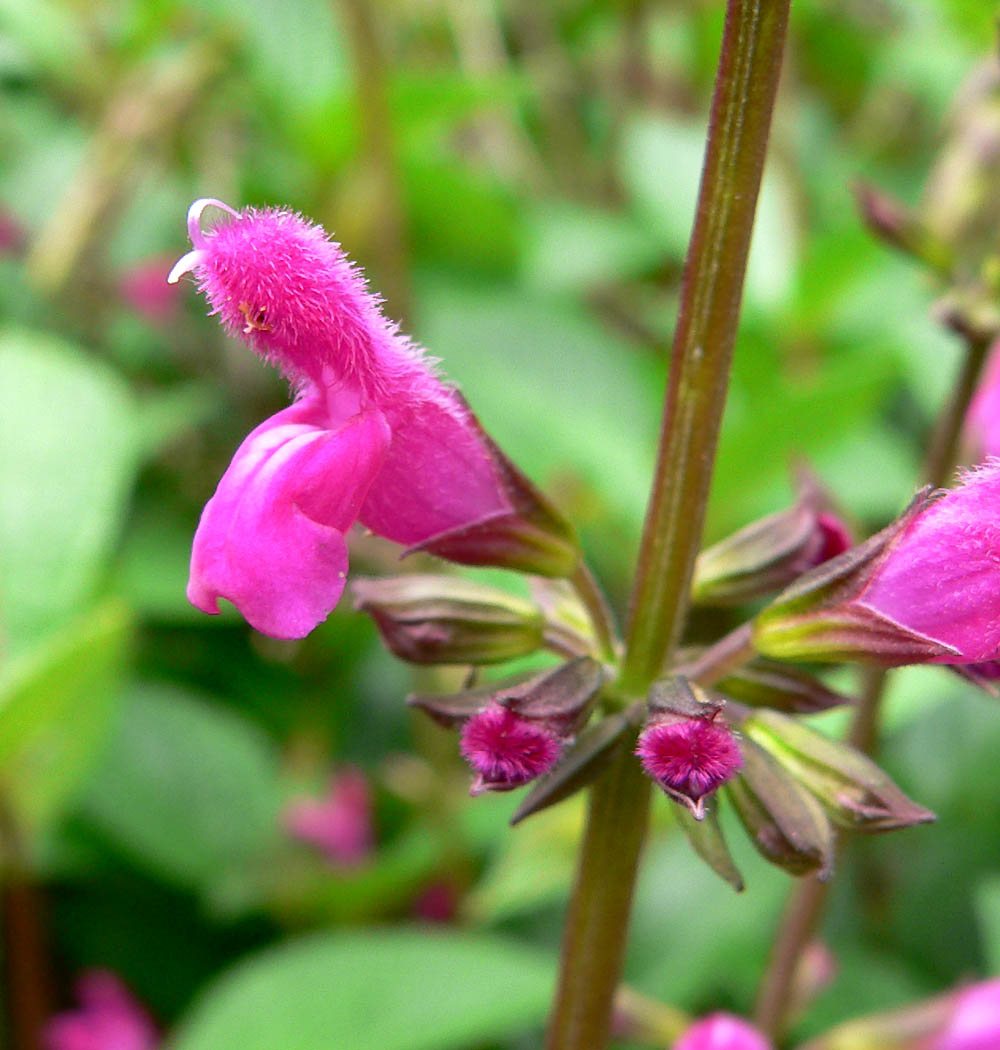
Salvia chiapensis

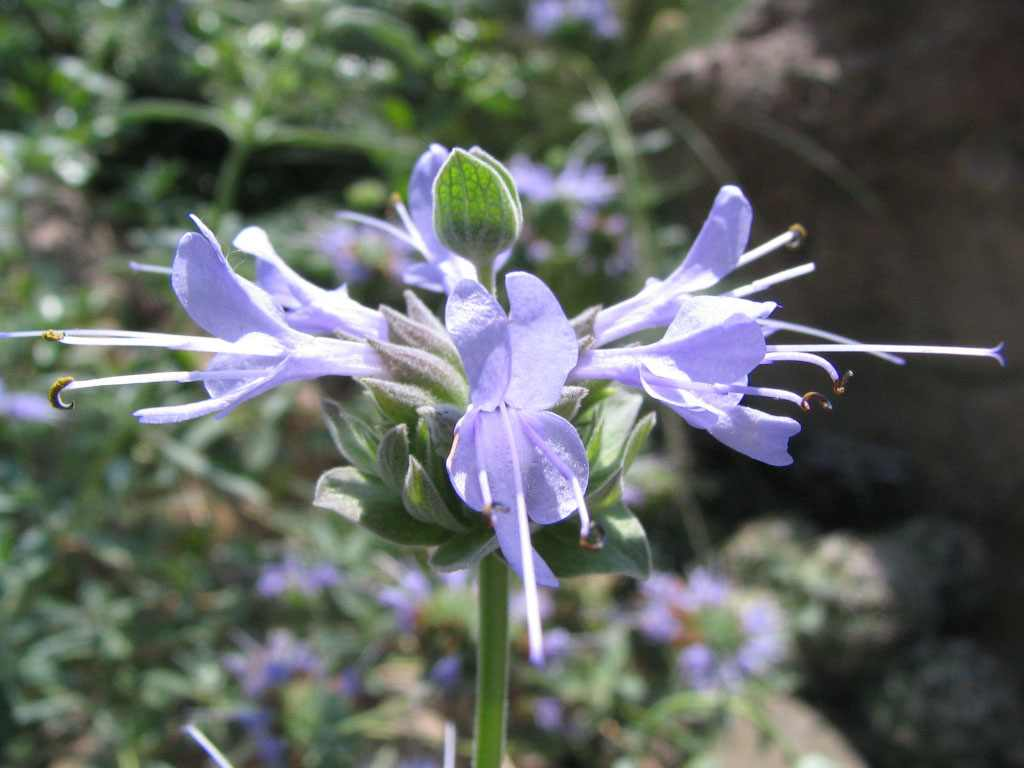
Salvia clevelandii

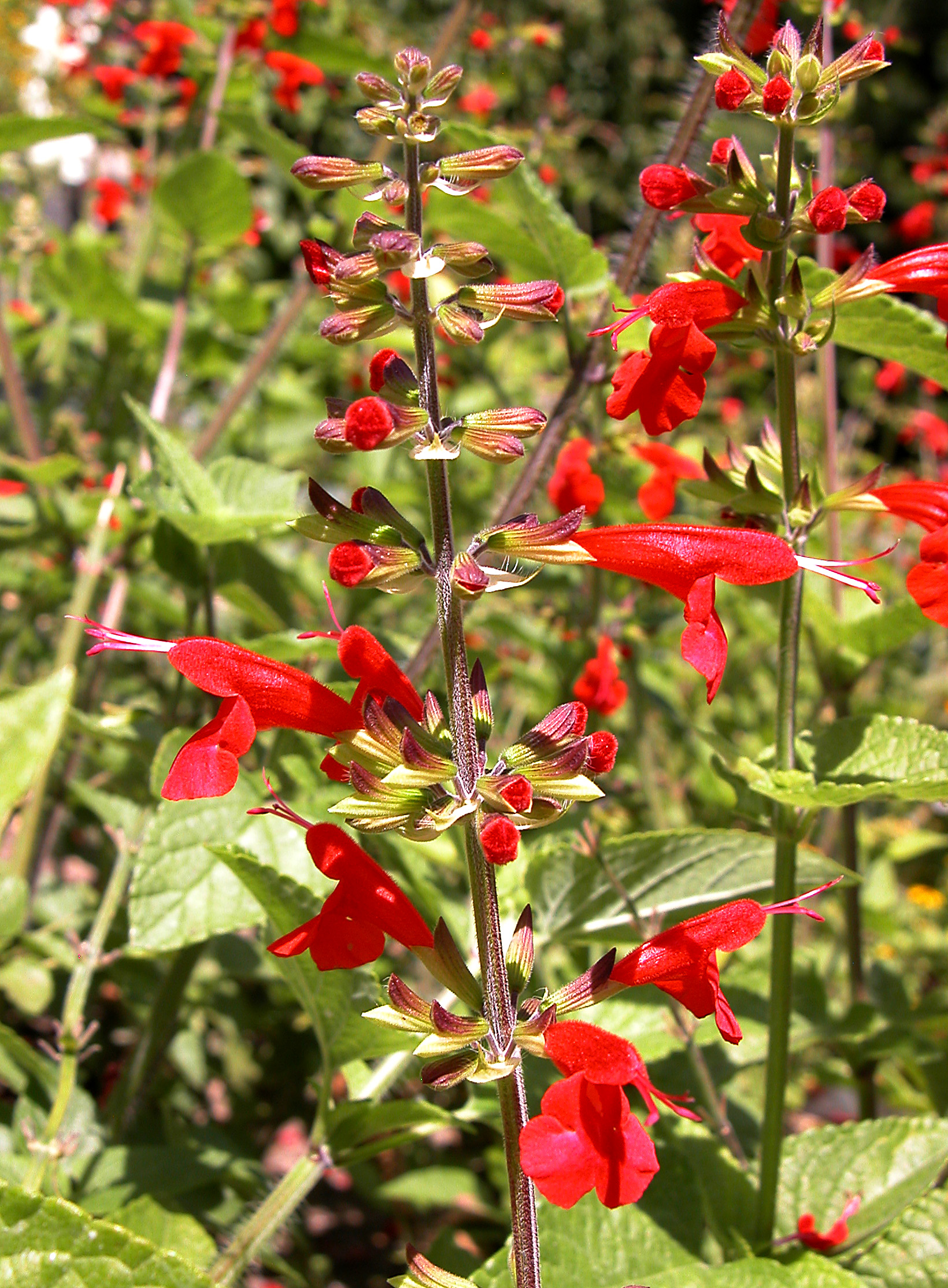
Salvia coccinea

- Salvia caaguazuensis Briq.
- Salvia cabonii Urb.
- Salvia cabulica Benth.
- Salvia cacaliifolia Benth.
- Salvia cacomensis J.G.González, J.G.Morales & J.L.Rodr.
- Salvia cadmica Boiss.
- Salvia caeruleobracteata Mart.Gord., D.Sandoval & García-Mend.
- Salvia caespitosa Montbret & Aucher ex Benth.
- Salvia cajamarcana J.G.González, Uria & M.Roncal
- Salvia calaminthifolia Vahl
- Salvia calcicola Harley
- Salvia calderoniae Bedolla & Zamudio
- Salvia californica Brandegee
- Salvia calolophos Epling
- Salvia camarifolia Benth.
- Salvia campanulata Wall. ex Benth.
- Salvia campicola Briq.
- Salvia camporum Epling
- Salvia campylodonta Botsch.
- Salvia cana Wall. ex Benth.
- Salvia canariensis L.
- Salvia candelabrum Boiss.
- Salvia candicans M.Martens & Galeotti
- Salvia candidissima Vahl
- Salvia canescens C.A.Mey.
- Salvia carbonoi Fern.Alonso
- Salvia cardenasii J.R.I.Wood
- Salvia cardiophylla Benth.
- Salvia carduacea Benth.
- Salvia carnea Kunth
- Salvia carranzae Zamudio & Bedolla
- Salvia carreyesii J.G.González
- Salvia carrilloi Véliz & Quedensley
- Salvia cassia Sam. ex Rech.f.
- Salvia castanea Diels
- Salvia cataractarum Briq.
- Salvia caudata Epling
- Salvia cavaleriei H.Lév.
- Salvia caymanensis Millsp. & Uline
- Salvia cedronella Boiss.
- Salvia cedrosensis Greene
- Salvia celendina J.R.I.Wood & Uria
- Salvia ceratophylla L.
- Salvia cerinopruinosa Rech.f.
- Salvia cerradicola E.P.Santos
- Salvia chalarothyrsa Fernald
- Salvia chamaedryoides Cav.
- Salvia chamelaeagnea Berg.
- Salvia changchuniana B.Y.Ding, Z.H.Chen & X.F.Jin
- Salvia chanryoenica Nakai
- Salvia chapadensis E.P.Santos & Harley
- Salvia chapalensis Briq.
- Salvia chapmanii A.Gray
- Salvia chazaroana B.L.Turner
- Salvia chiapensis Fernald
- Salvia chicamochae J.R.I.Wood & Harley
- Salvia chienii E.Peter
- Salvia chinensis Benth.
- Salvia chionantha Boiss.
- Salvia chionopeplica Epling
- Salvia chionophylla Fernald
- Salvia chloroleuca Rech.f. & Aellen
- Salvia chorassanica Bunge
- Salvia chrysophylla Stapf
- Salvia chudaei Batt. & Trab.
- Salvia chunganensis C.Y.Wu & Y.C.Huang
- Salvia cilicica Boiss.
- Salvia cinnabarina M.Martens & Galeotti
- Salvia circinnata Cav.
- Salvia clarendonensis Britton
- Salvia clarkcowanii B.L.Turner
- Salvia clausa Vell.
- Salvia clementiae Pendry & Y.K.Wei
- Salvia clevelandii (A.Gray) Greene
- Salvia clinopodioides Kunth
- Salvia coahuilensis Fernald
- Salvia coccinea Buc'hoz ex Etl.
- Salvia cocuyana Fern.Alonso
- Salvia codazziana Fern.Alonso
- Salvia cognata Urb. & Ekman
- Salvia collinsii Donn.Sm.
- Salvia colonica Standl. & L.O.Williams ex Klitg.
- Salvia columbariae Benth.
- Salvia comayaguana Standl.
- Salvia compacta Kuntze
- Salvia compar (Wissjul.) Trautv. ex Sosn.
- Salvia compressa Vent.
- Salvia compsostachys Epling
- Salvia concolor Lamb. ex Benth.
- Salvia confertiflora Pohl
- Salvia confertispicata Fragoso & Mart.Gord.
- Salvia congestiflora Epling
- Salvia connivens Epling
- Salvia consobrina Epling
- Salvia corazonica Gilli
- Salvia cordata Benth.
- Salvia coriana Quedensley & Véliz
- Salvia corrugata Vahl
- Salvia costaricensis Oerst.
- Salvia costata Epling
- Salvia coulteri Fernald
- Salvia crucis Epling
- Salvia cruckshanksii Benth.
- Salvia cryptoclada Baker
- Salvia cryptodonta Fernald
- Salvia cualensis J.G.González
- Salvia cuatrecasasiana Epling
- Salvia cubensis Britton & P.Wilson
- Salvia curta Epling
- Salvia curticalyx Epling
- Salvia curviflora Benth.
- Salvia cuspidata Ruiz & Pav.
- Salvia cyanantha Epling
- Salvia cyanescens Boiss. & Balansa
- Salvia cyanicalyx Epling
- Salvia cyanocephala Epling
- Salvia cyanotropha Epling
- Salvia cyclostegia E.Peter
- Salvia cylindriflora Epling
- Salvia cynica Dunn

== D ==
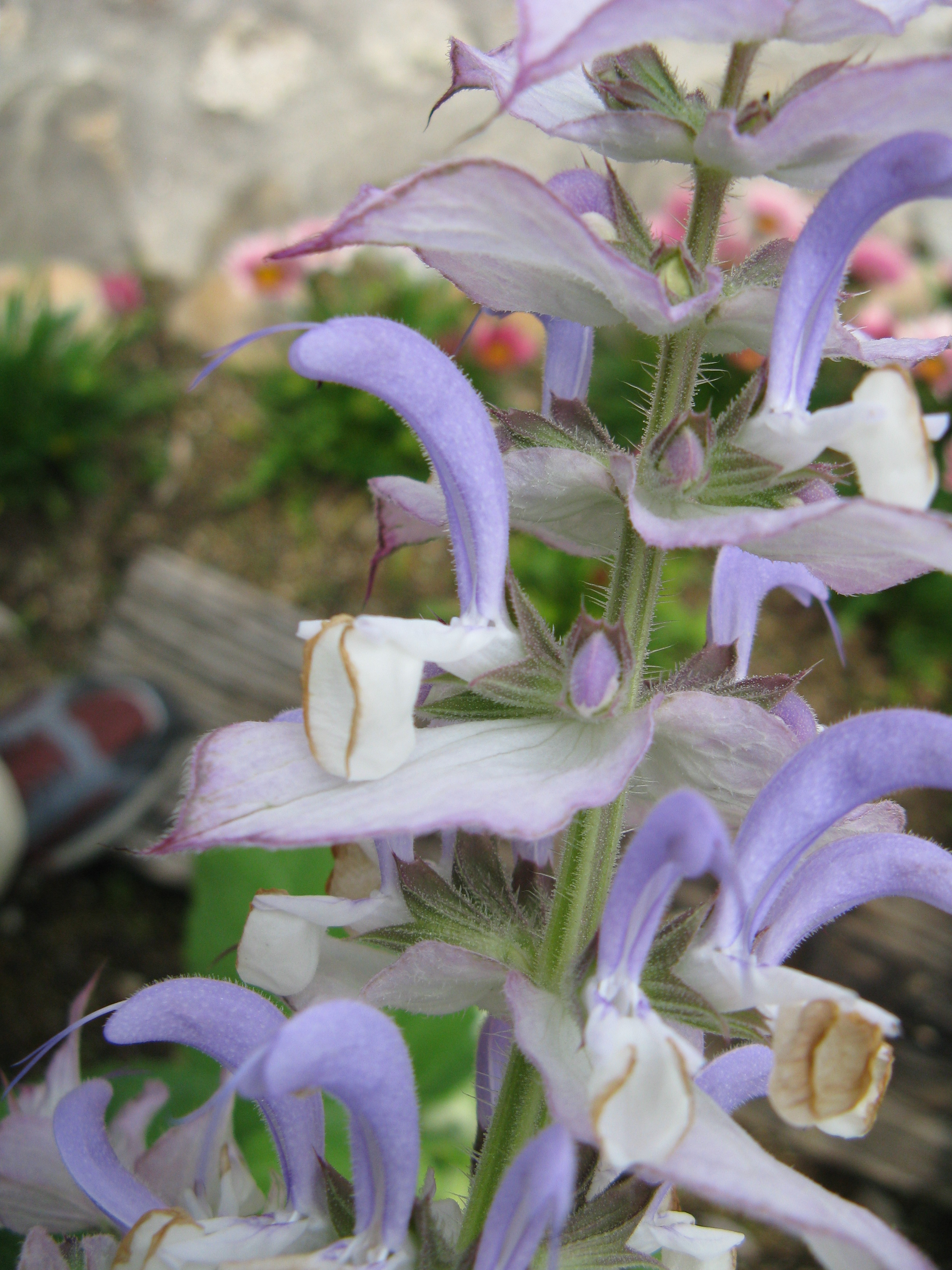
Salvia desoleana

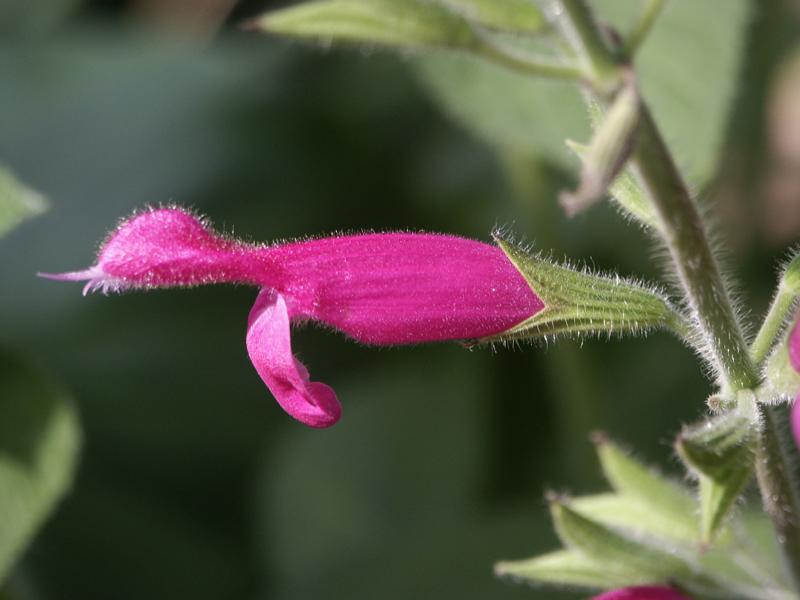
Salvia dorisiana

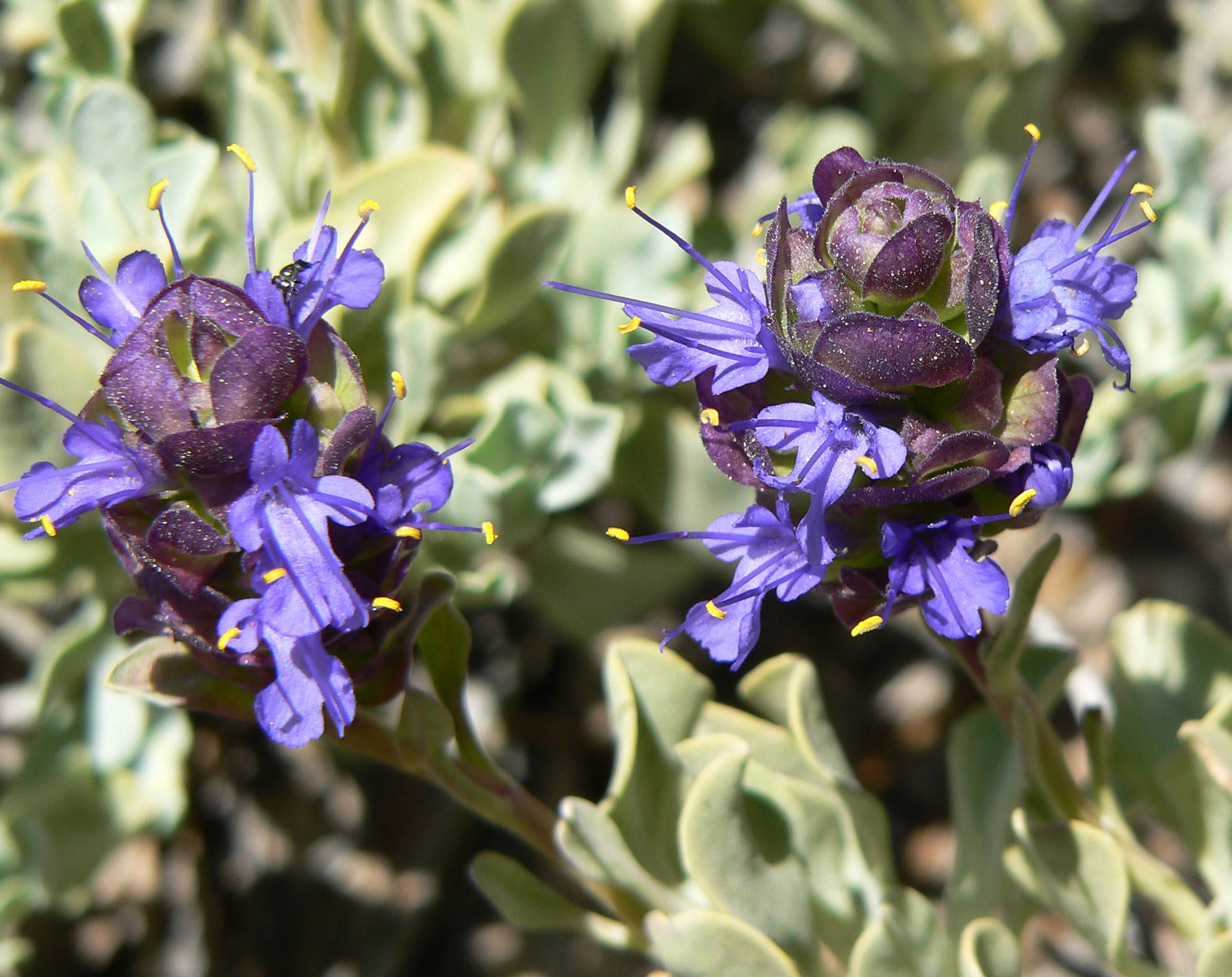
Salvia dorrii

- Salvia dabieshanensis J.Q.He
- Salvia daiguii Y.K.Wei & Y.B.Huang
- Salvia darcyi J.Compton
- Salvia dasyantha Lem.
- Salvia decora Epling
- Salvia decumbens Alain
- Salvia decurrens Epling
- Salvia densiflora Benth.
- Salvia dentata Aiton
- Salvia deserta Schangin
- Salvia deserti Decne.
- Salvia desoleana Atzei & V.Picci
- Salvia diamantina E.P.Santos & Harley
- Salvia dianthera Roth
- Salvia dichlamys Epling
- Salvia dichroantha Stapf
- Salvia digitaloides Diels
- Salvia discolor Kunth
- Salvia disermas L.
- Salvia disjuncta Fernald
- Salvia divaricata Montbret & Aucher ex Benth.
- Salvia divinorum Epling & Játiva
- Salvia dolichantha E.Peter
- Salvia dolomitica Codd
- Salvia dombeyi Epling
- Salvia dominica L.
- Salvia dorisiana Standl.
- Salvia dorrii (Kellogg) Abrams
- Salvia dorystaechas B.T.Drew
- Salvia drobovii Botsch.
- Salvia drusica Mouterde
- Salvia dryophila Epling
- Salvia dugesiana Epling
- Salvia dugesii Fernald
- Salvia dumetorum Andrz. ex Besser
- Salvia durangensis J.G.González
- Salvia durantiflora Epling
- Salvia duripes Epling & Mathias

== E ==
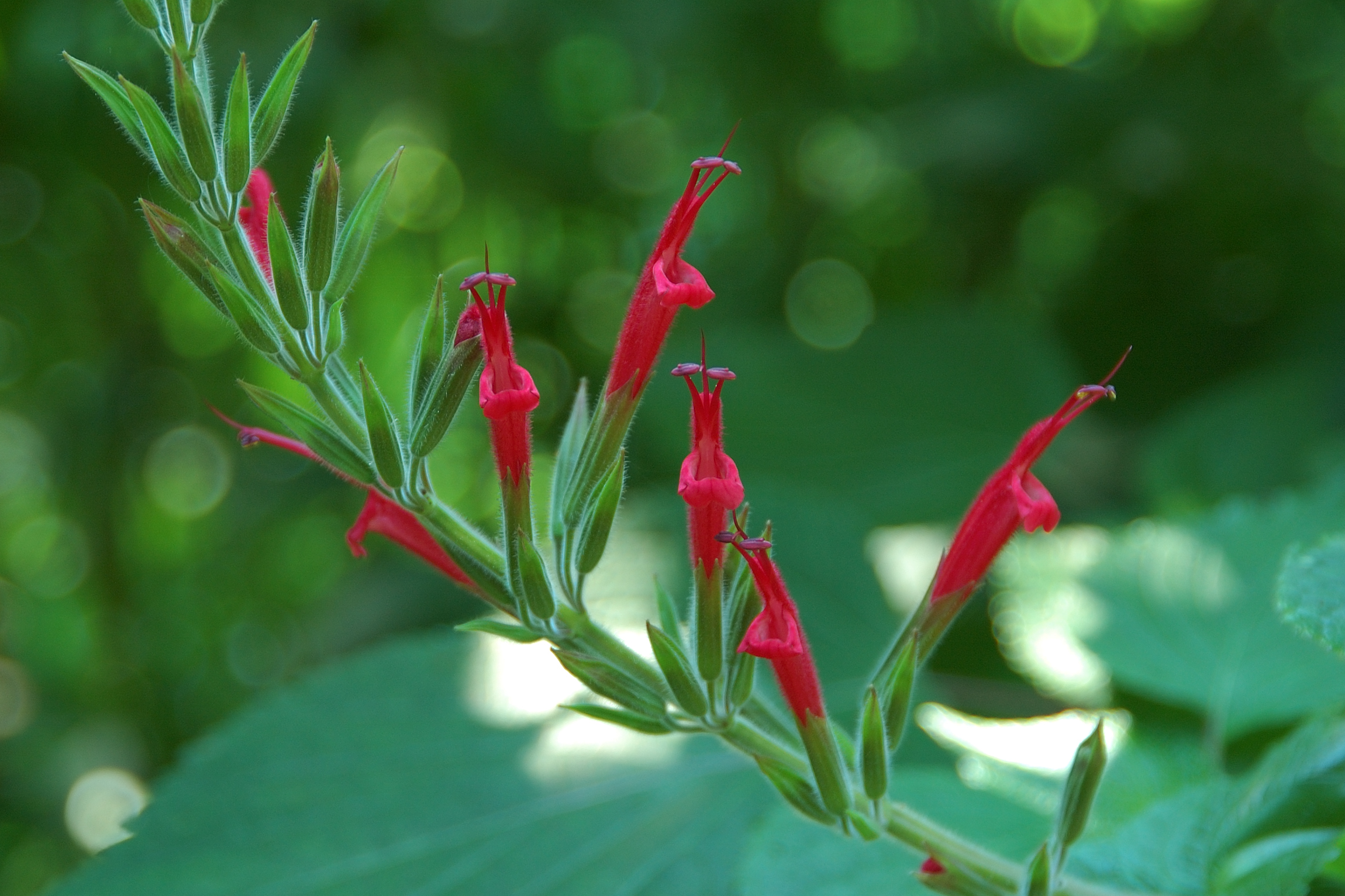
Salvia elegans

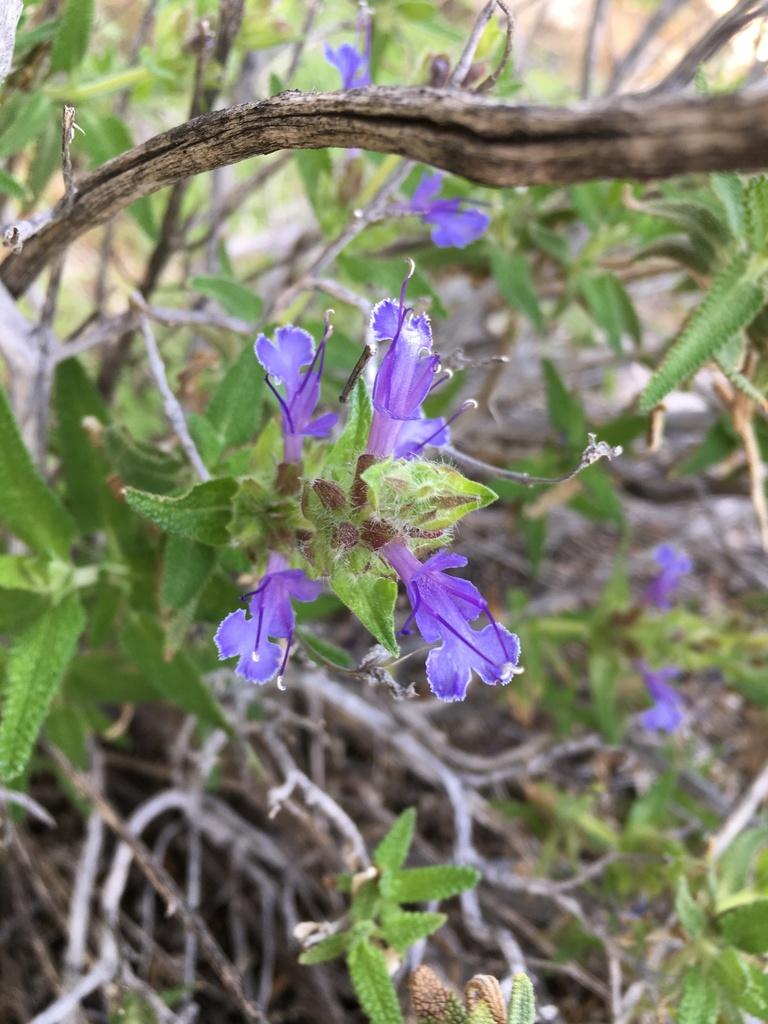
Salvia eremostachya

- Salvia ecbatanensis Stapf
- Salvia ecuadorensis Briq.
- Salvia eichleriana Heldr. ex Halácsy
- Salvia eigii Zohary
- Salvia eizi-matudae Ramamoorthy
- Salvia ekimiana Celep & Dogan
- Salvia elegans Vahl
- Salvia elenevskyi Pobed.
- Salvia emaciata Epling
- Salvia engelmannii A.Gray
- Salvia eplingiana Alziar
- Salvia eremophila Boiss.
- Salvia eremostachya Jeps.
- Salvia eriocalyx Bertero ex Roem. & Schult.
- Salvia eriophora Boiss. & Kotschy
- Salvia ernesti-vargasii C.Nelson
- Salvia ertekinii Yıld.
- Salvia erythropoda Rusby
- Salvia erythrostoma Epling
- Salvia espirito-santensis Brade & Barb.Per.
- Salvia euphratica Montbret & Aucher ex Benth.
- Salvia evadens J.G.González & Art.Castro
- Salvia evansiana Hand.-Mazz.
- Salvia exilis Epling
- Salvia expansa Epling
- Salvia exserta Griseb.

== F ==
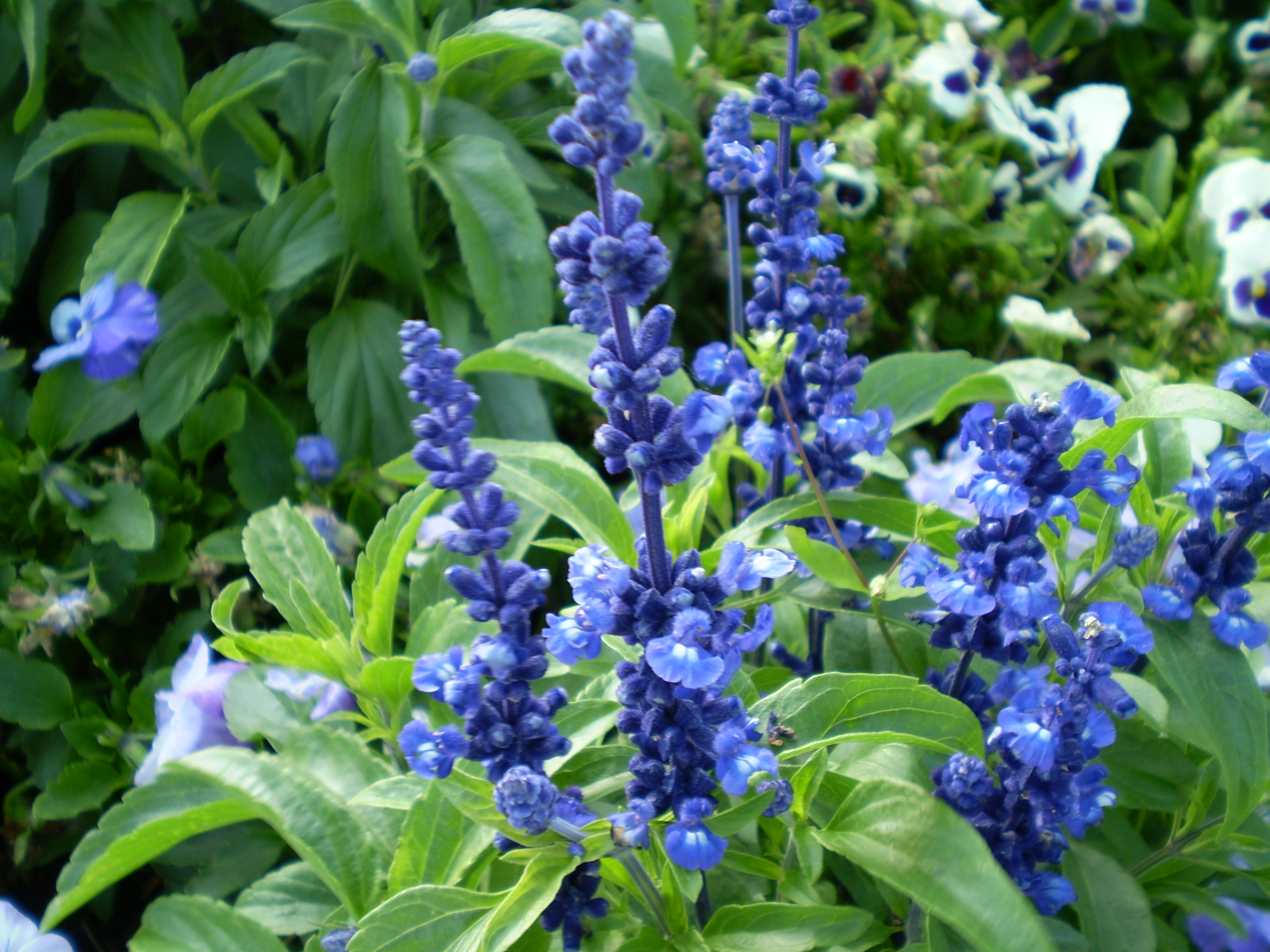
Salvia farinacea

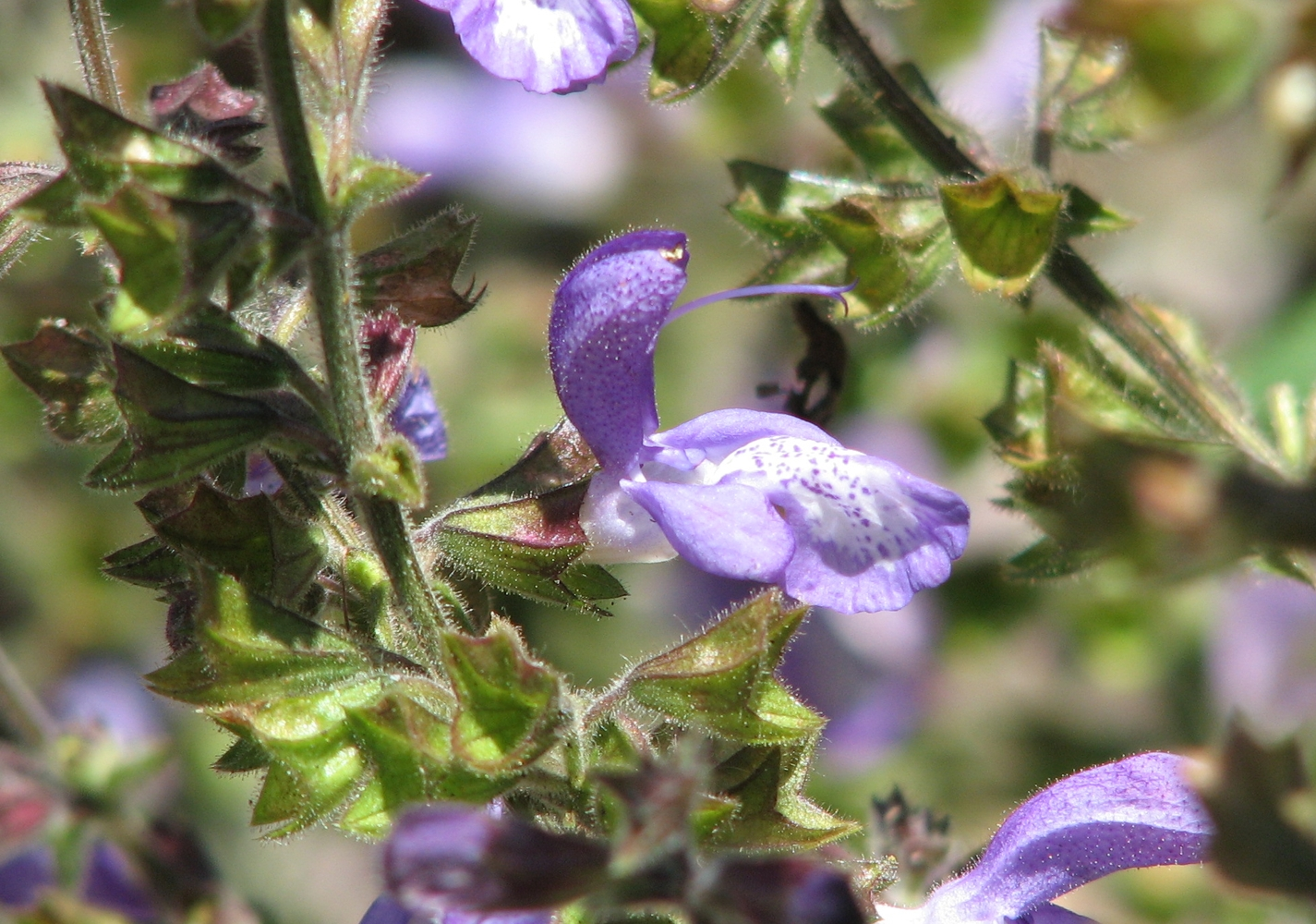
Salvia forskaehlei

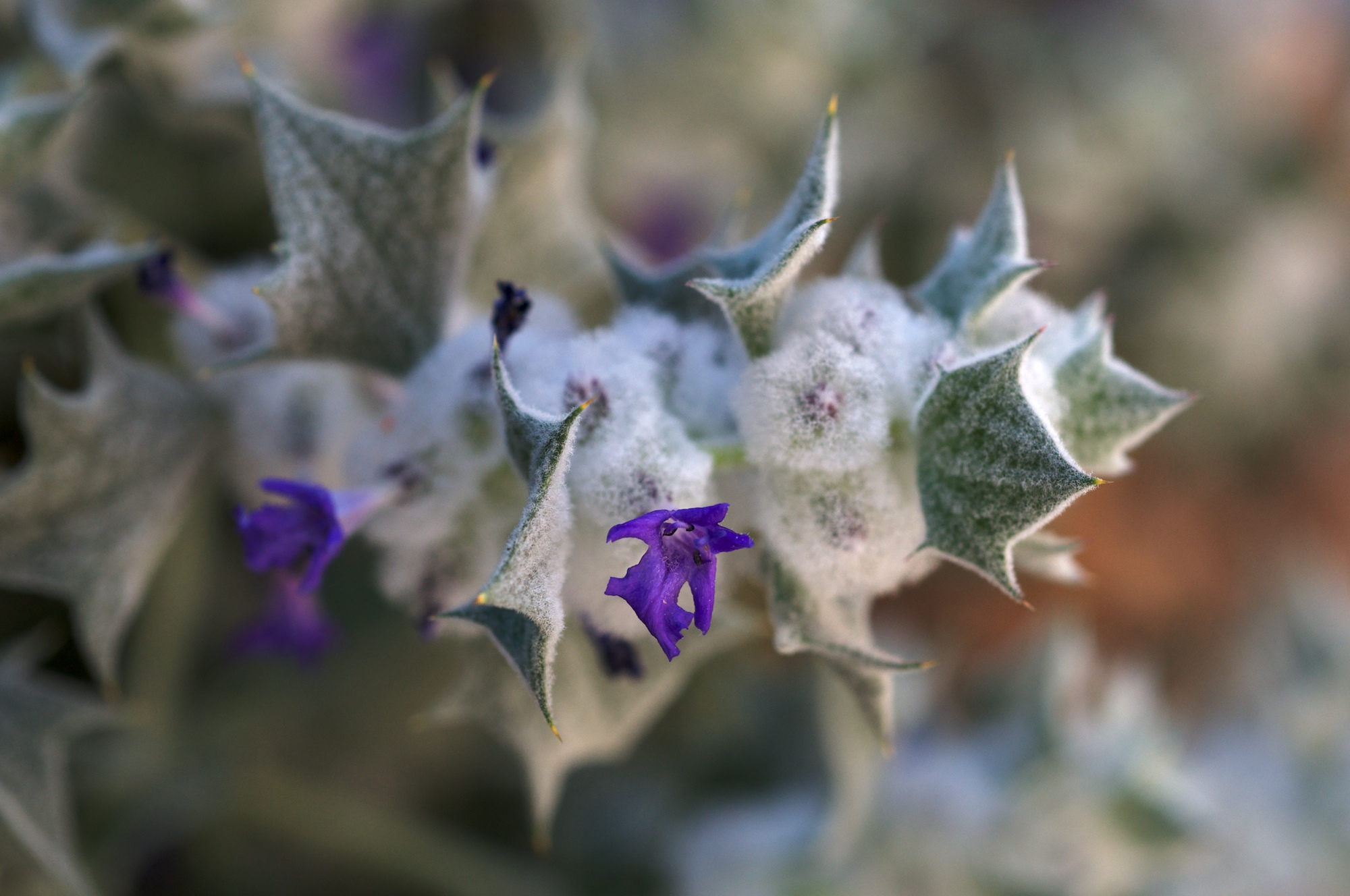
Salvia funerea

- Salvia fairuziana R.M.Haber & Semaan
- Salvia falcata J.R.I.Wood & Harley
- Salvia farinacea Benth.
- Salvia filicifolia Merr.
- Salvia filifolia Ramamoorthy
- Salvia filipes Benth.
- Salvia fimbriaticalyx Mart.Gord. & Fragoso
- Salvia firma Fernald
- Salvia flaccida Fernald
- Salvia flaccidifolia Fernald
- Salvia flava Forrest ex Diels
- Salvia flocculosa Benth.
- Salvia florida Benth.
- Salvia fluviatilis Fernald
- Salvia fominii Grossh.
- Salvia forskaehlei L.
- Salvia foveolata Urb. & Ekman
- Salvia fragarioides C.Y.Wu
- Salvia freyniana Bornm.
- Salvia frigida Boiss.
- Salvia fruticetorum Benth.
- Salvia fruticosa Mill.
- Salvia fruticulosa Benth.
- Salvia fugax Pobed.
- Salvia fulgens Cav.
- Salvia funckii Briq.
- Salvia funerea M.E.Jones
- Salvia fusca Epling
- Salvia fuscomanicata Fern.Alonso

== G ==
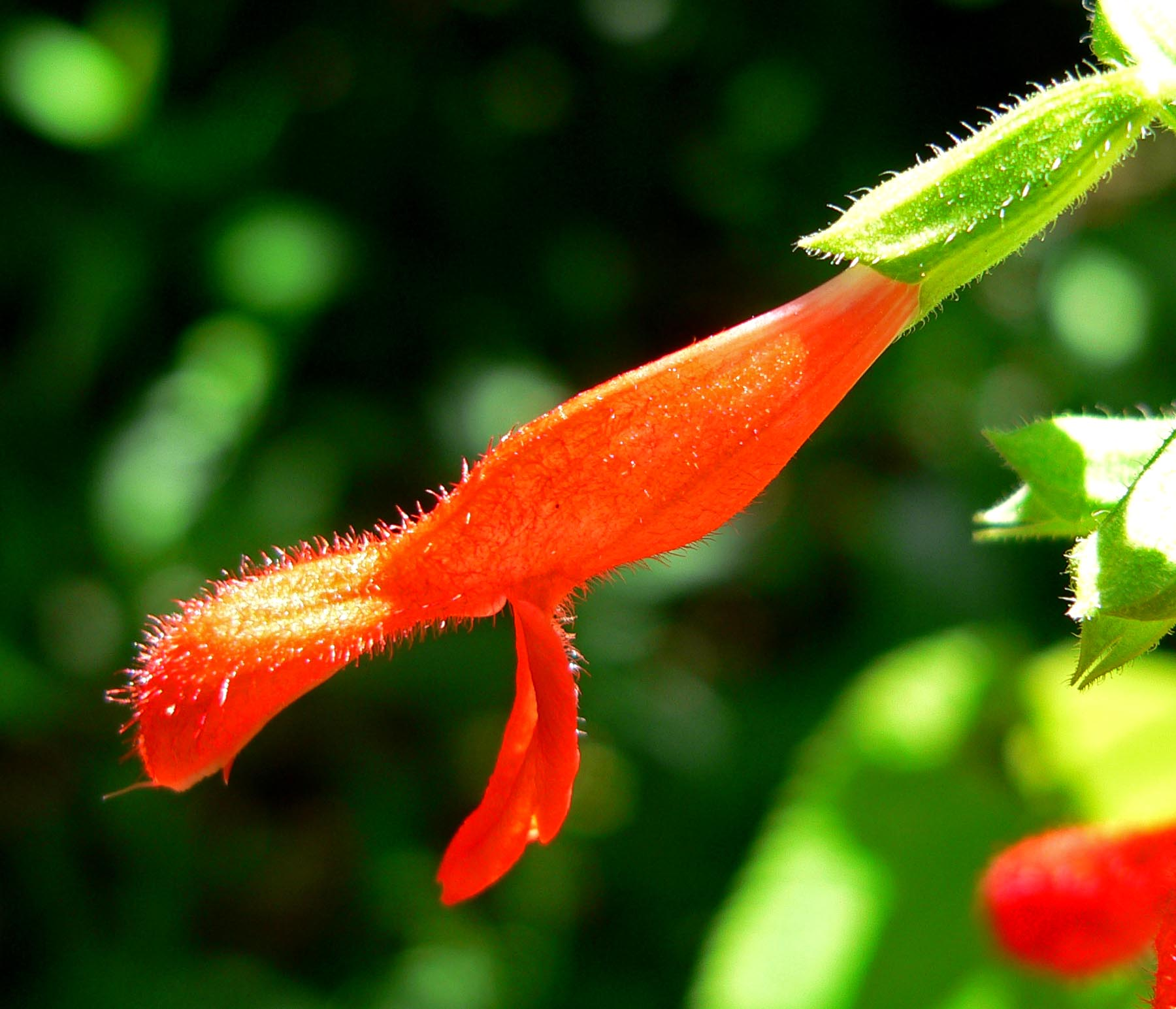
Salvia gesneriflora

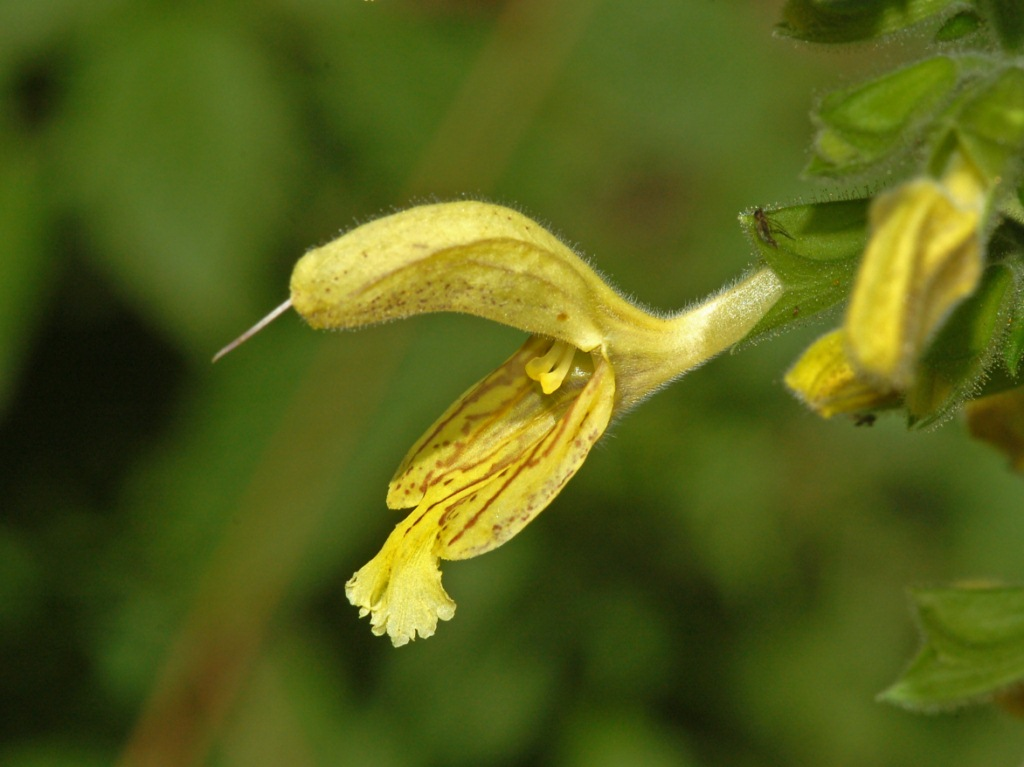
Salvia glutinosa

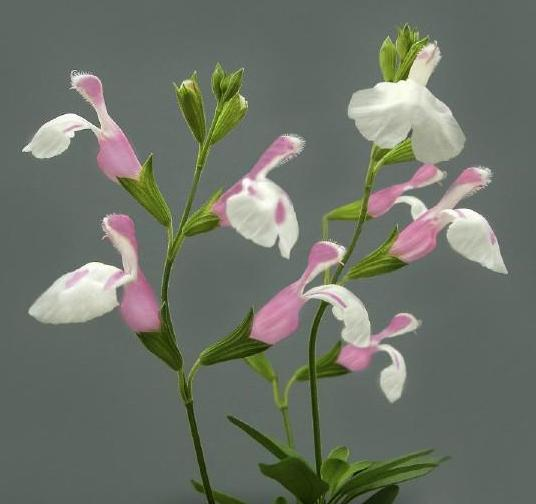
Salvia greggii

- Salvia galloana B.L.Turner
- Salvia garedjii Troitsky
- Salvia garipensis E.Mey.
- Salvia gattefossei Emb.
- Salvia gavilanensis Martínez-Ambr., Fragoso & Mart.Gord.
- Salvia geminata Thulin
- Salvia gesneriflora Lindl. & Paxton
- Salvia glabra M.Martens & Galeotti
- Salvia glabrata Kunth
- Salvia glabrescens Makino
- Salvia glabricaulis Pobed.
- Salvia glandulifera Cav.
- Salvia glumacea Kunth
- Salvia glutinosa L.
- Salvia goldmanii Fernald
- Salvia golneviana Rzazade
- Salvia gomezpompae J.G.González & Bedolla
- Salvia gontscharowii Kudrjasch.
- Salvia gonzalezii Fernald
- Salvia gracilipes Epling
- Salvia graciliramulosa Epling & Játiva
- Salvia granatensis B.T.Drew
- Salvia grandifolia W.W.Sm.
- Salvia grandis Epling
- Salvia granitica Hochst.
- Salvia gravida Epling
- Salvia greatae Brandegee
- Salvia greggii A.Gray
- Salvia grewiifolia S.Moore
- Salvia grisea Epling & Mathias
- Salvia griseifolia Epling
- Salvia grossheimii Sosn.
- Salvia guacana Fern.Alonso
- Salvia guadalajarensis Briq.
- Salvia guaneorum Fern.Alonso
- Salvia guaranitica A.St.-Hil. ex Benth.
- Salvia guevarae Bedolla & Zamudio
- Salvia gypsophila B.L.Turner

== H ==
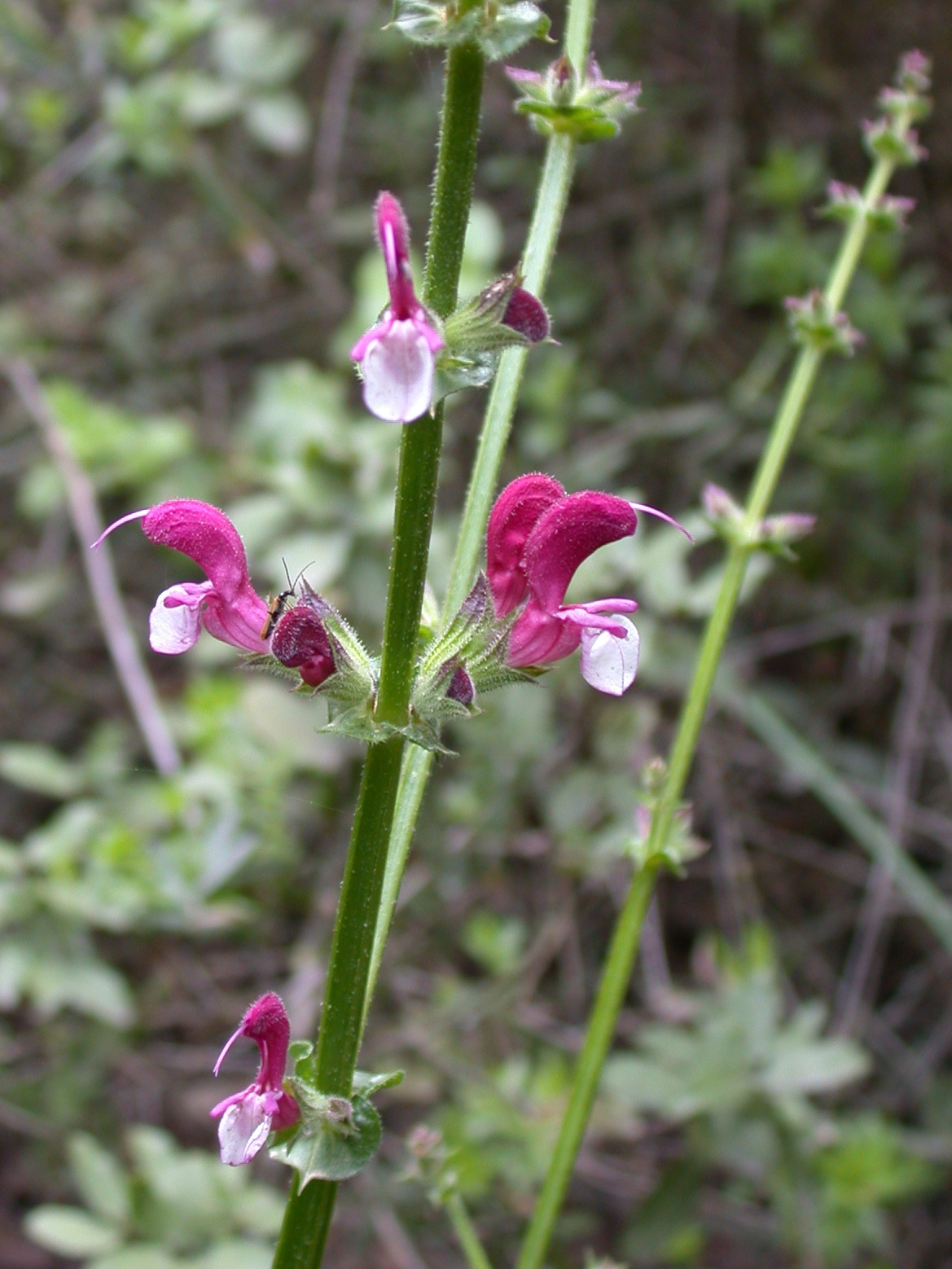
Salvia hierosolymitana

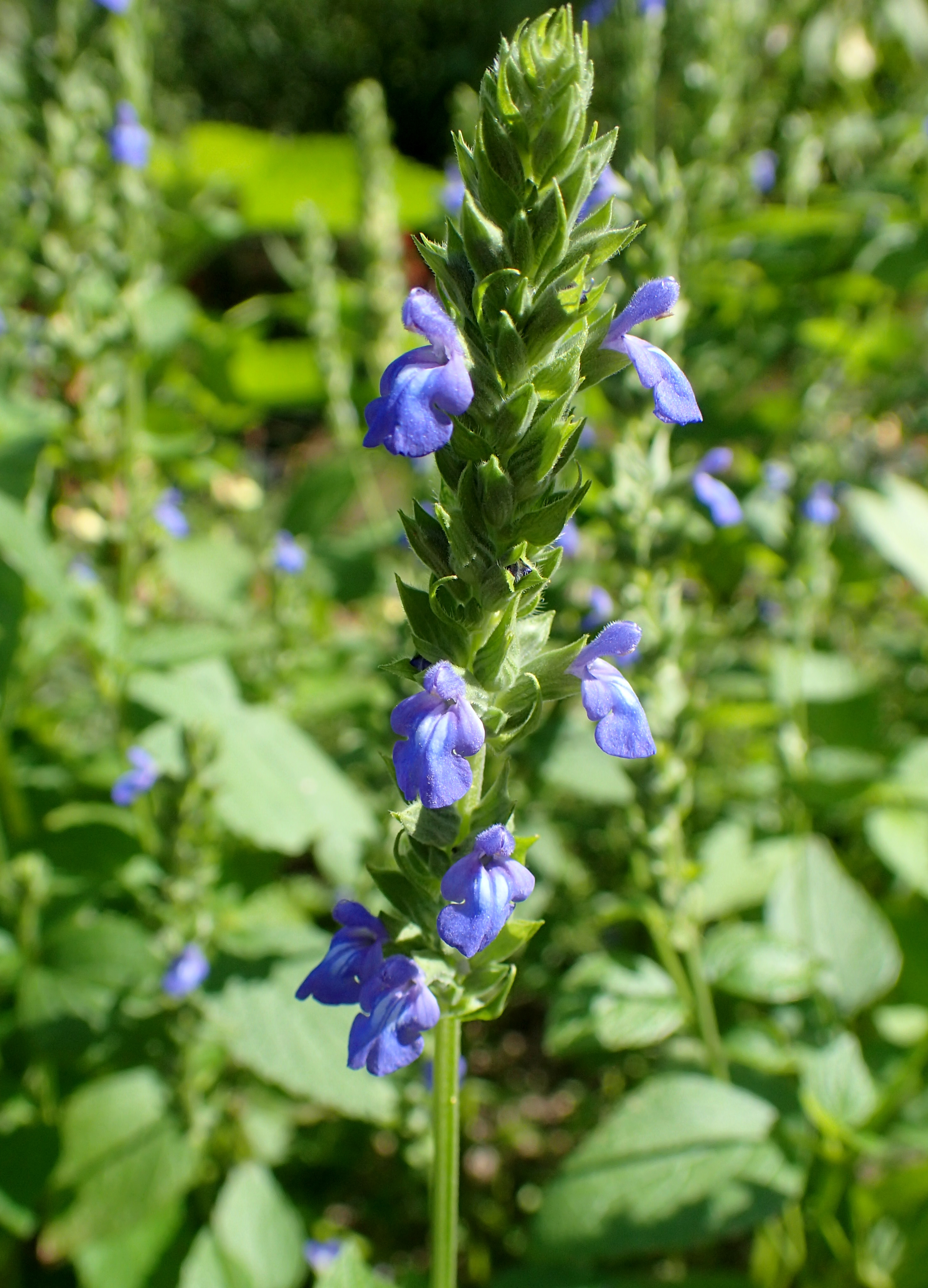
Salvia hispanica

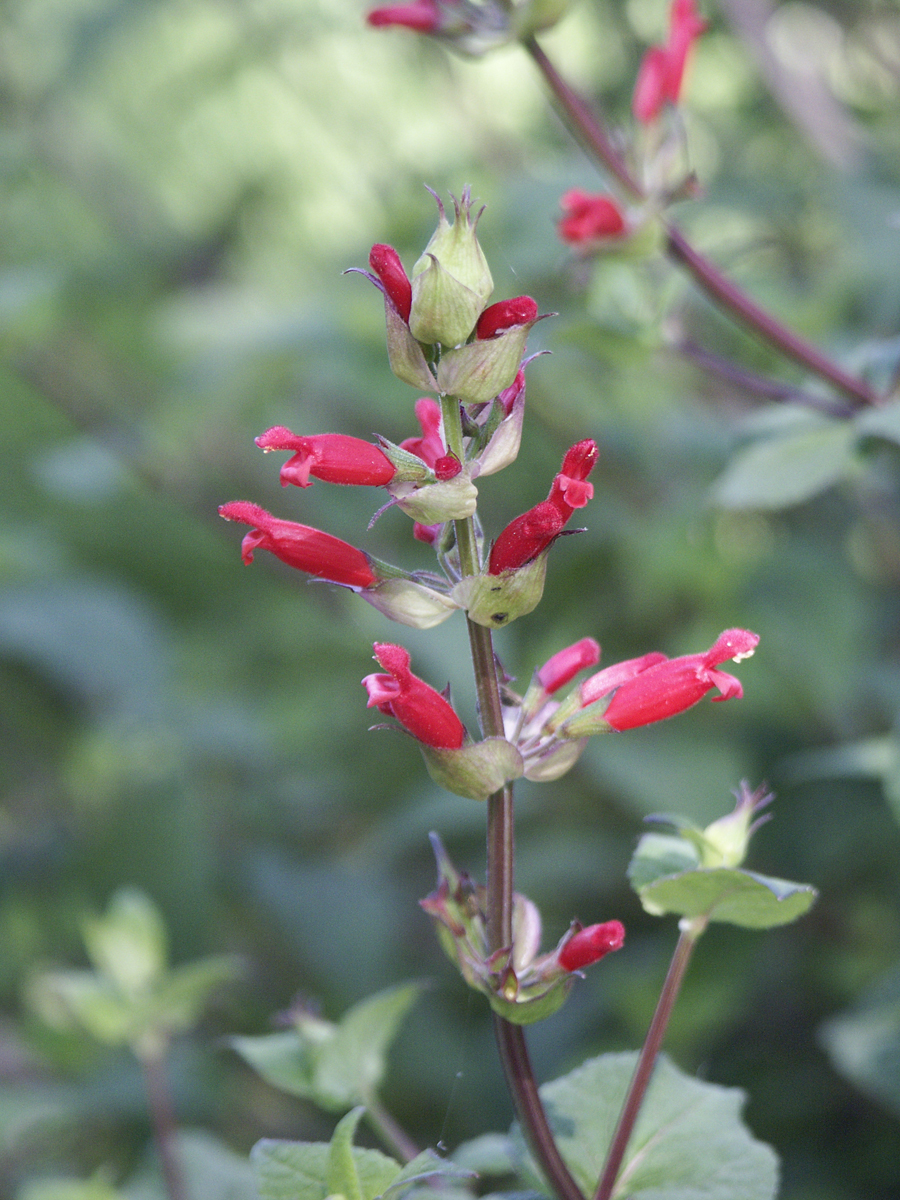
Salvia holwayi

- Salvia haenkei Benth.
- Salvia haitiensis Urb.
- Salvia hajastana Pobed.
- Salvia halophila Hedge
- Salvia hamulus Epling
- Salvia handelii E.Peter
- Salvia hapalophylla Epling
- Salvia harleyana E.P.Santos
- Salvia hasankeyfensis Dirmenci, Celep & Ö.Güner
- Salvia hatschbachii E.P.Santos
- Salvia haussknechtii Boiss.
- Salvia hayatae Makino ex Hayata
- Salvia hedgeana Dönmez
- Salvia heerii Regel
- Salvia heldreichiana Boiss. ex A.DC.
- Salvia helianthemifolia Benth.
- Salvia henryi A.Gray
- Salvia herbacea Benth.
- Salvia herbanica A.Santos & M.Fernández
- Salvia hermesiana Fern.Alonso
- Salvia herrerae Epling
- Salvia heterochroa E.Peter
- Salvia heterofolia Epling & Mathias
- Salvia heterotricha Fernald
- Salvia hians Royle ex Benth.
- Salvia hidalgensis Miranda
- Salvia hierosolymitana Boiss.
- Salvia hilarii Benth.
- Salvia hillcoatiae Hedge
- Salvia himmelbaurii E.Peter
- Salvia hintonii Epling
- Salvia hirsuta Jacq.
- Salvia hirta Kunth
- Salvia hirtella Vahl
- Salvia hispanica L.
- Salvia holwayi S.F.Blake
- Salvia honania L.H.Bailey
- Salvia hotteana Urb. & Ekman
- Salvia huastecana Bedolla, Zamudio & H.Castillo-Gómez
- Salvia huberi Hedge
- Salvia humboldtiana F.Dietr.
- Salvia hunzikeri A.Granda
- Salvia hupehensis E.Peter
- Salvia hydrangea DC. ex Benth.
- Salvia hylocharis Diels
- Salvia hypargeia Fisch. & C.A.Mey.
- Salvia hypochionaea Boiss.
- Salvia hypoleuca Benth.

== I ==
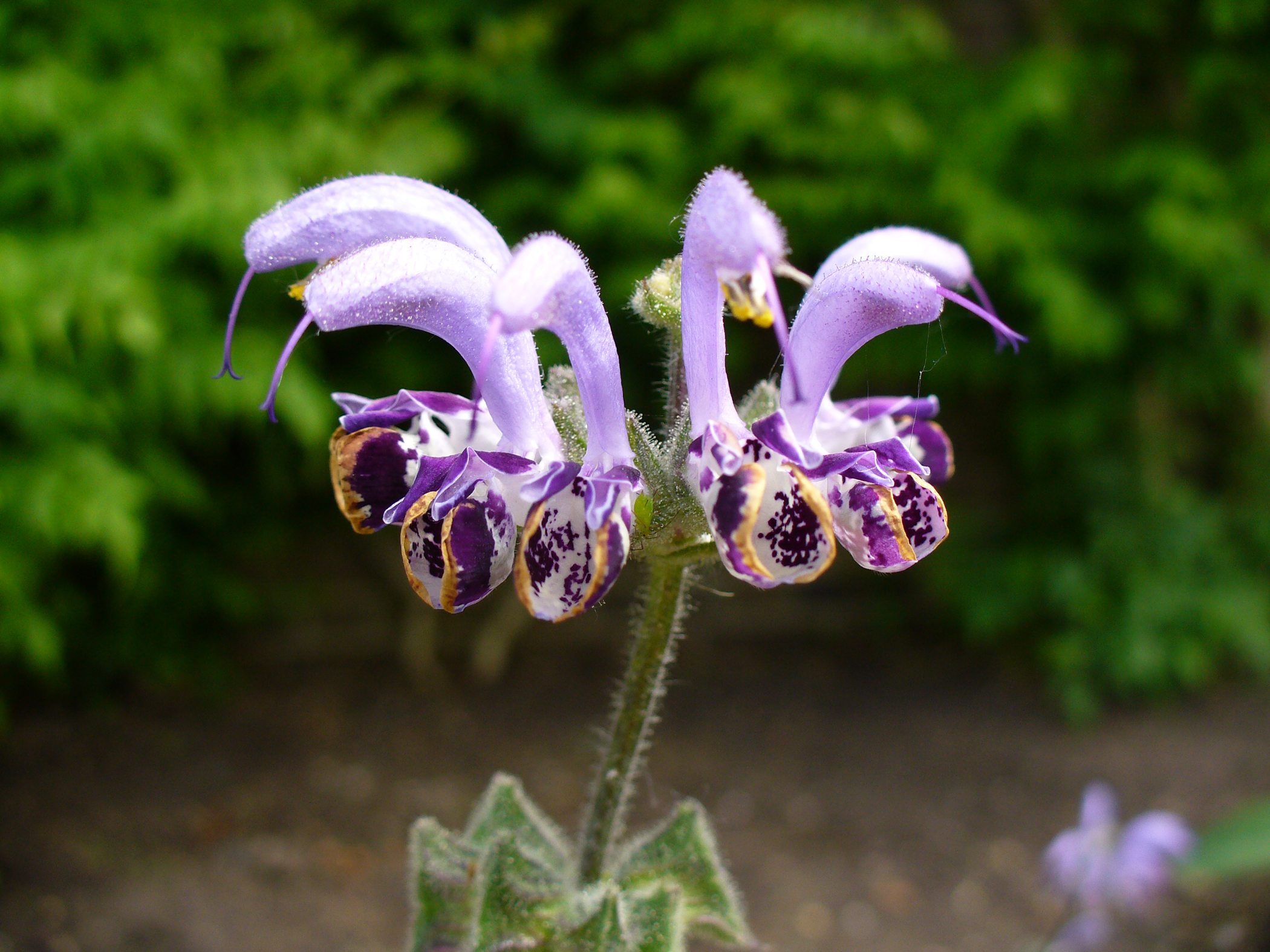
Salvia indica

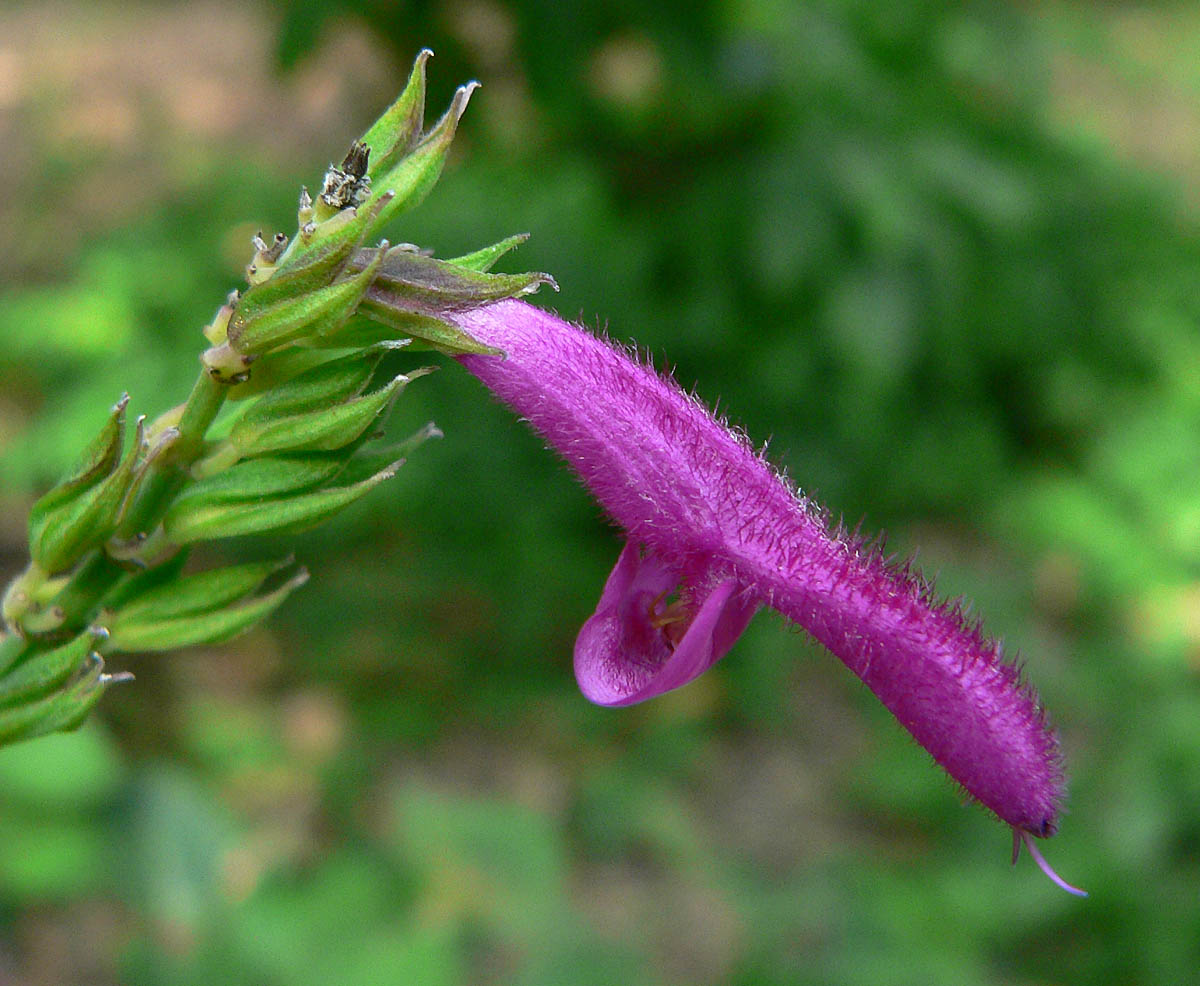
Salvia iodantha

- Salvia ibugana J.G.González
- Salvia incumbens Urb. & Ekman
- Salvia incurvata Ruiz & Pav.
- Salvia indica L.
- Salvia indigocephala Ramamoorthy
- Salvia infuscata Epling
- Salvia innoxia Epling & Mathias
- Salvia inornata Epling
- Salvia insignis Kudr.
- Salvia integrifolia Ruiz & Pav.
- Salvia interrupta Schousb.
- Salvia intonsa Epling
- Salvia involucrata Cav.
- Salvia iodantha Fernald
- Salvia iodophylla Epling
- Salvia ionocalyx Epling
- Salvia isensis Nakai ex H.Hara
- Salvia isochroma (Fernald) B.L.Turner
- Salvia itaguassuensis Brade & Barb.Per.
- Salvia itatiaiensis Dusén
- Salvia iuliana Epling

== J ==
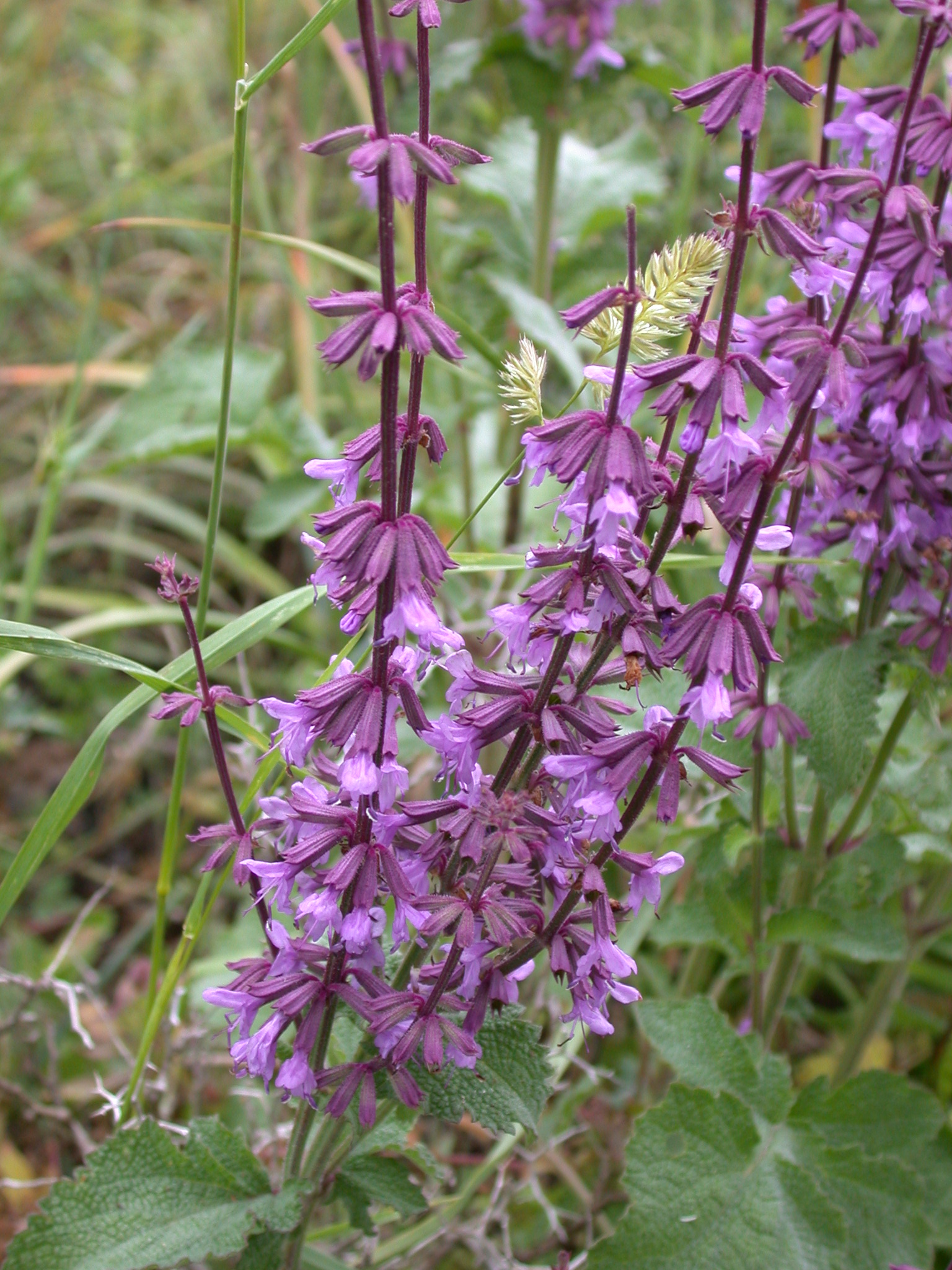
Salvia judaica

- Salvia jacalana B.L.Turner
- Salvia jacobi Epling
- Salvia jaimehintoniana Ramamoorthy ex B.L.Turner
- Salvia jamaicensis Fawc.
- Salvia jaminiana de Noé
- Salvia jamzadii Mozaff.
- Salvia japonica Thunb.
- Salvia jaramilloi Fern.Alonso
- Salvia jessicae B.L.Turner
- Salvia jordanii J.B.Walker
- Salvia judaica Boiss.
- Salvia jurisicii Košanin

== K ==
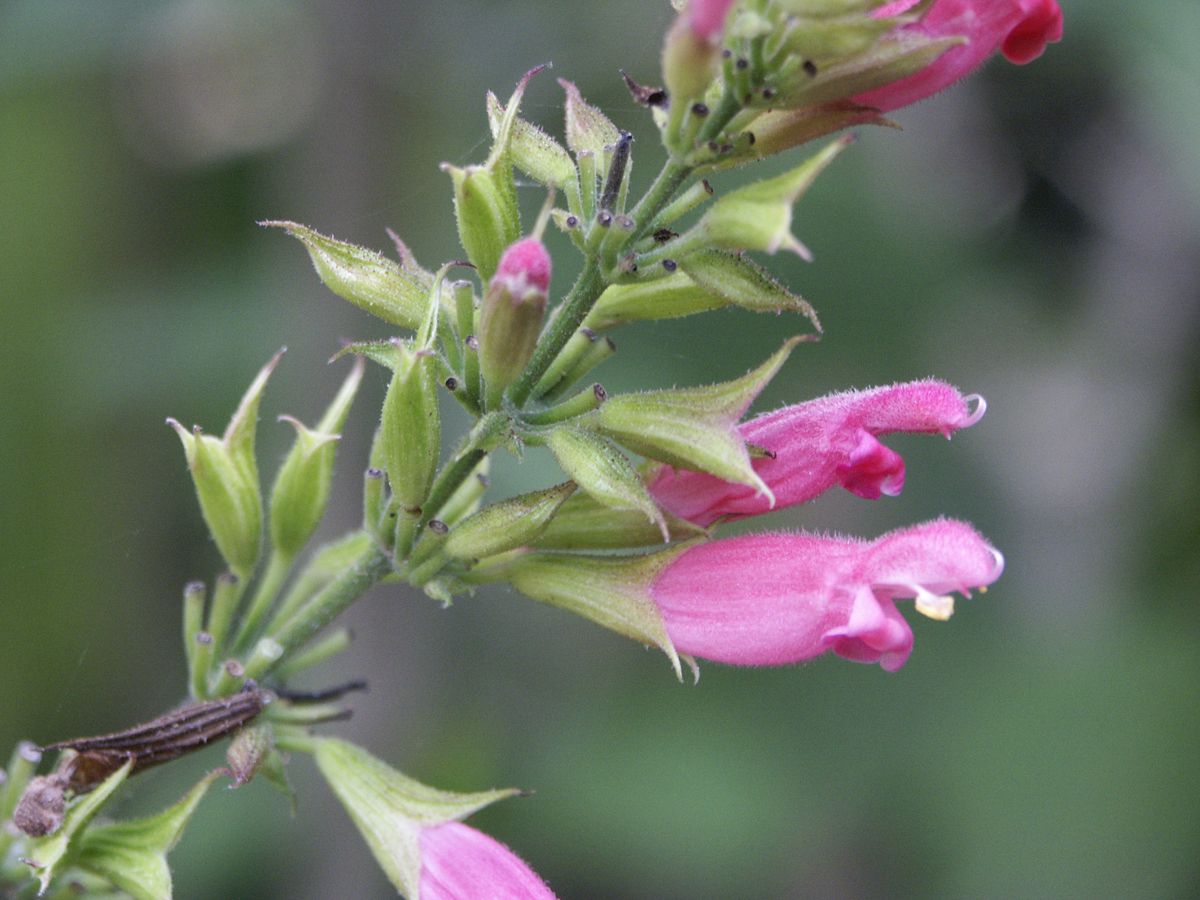
Salvia karwinskii

- Salvia kamelinii Makhm.
- Salvia karabachensis Pobed.
- Salvia karelinii J.B.Walker
- Salvia karwinskii Benth.
- Salvia keerlii Benth.
- Salvia kellermanii Donn.Sm.
- Salvia kermanshahensis Rech.f.
- Salvia kiangsiensis C.Y.Wu
- Salvia kiaometiensis H.Lév.
- Salvia klokovii J.B.Walker
- Salvia komarovii Pobed.
- Salvia korolkovii Regel & Schmalh.
- Salvia koyamae Makino
- Salvia kronenburgii Rech.f.
- Salvia kudrjaschevii (Gorschk. & Pjataeva) Sytsma
- Salvia kurdica Boiss. & Hohen. ex Benth.
- Salvia kuznetzovii Sosn.

== L ==
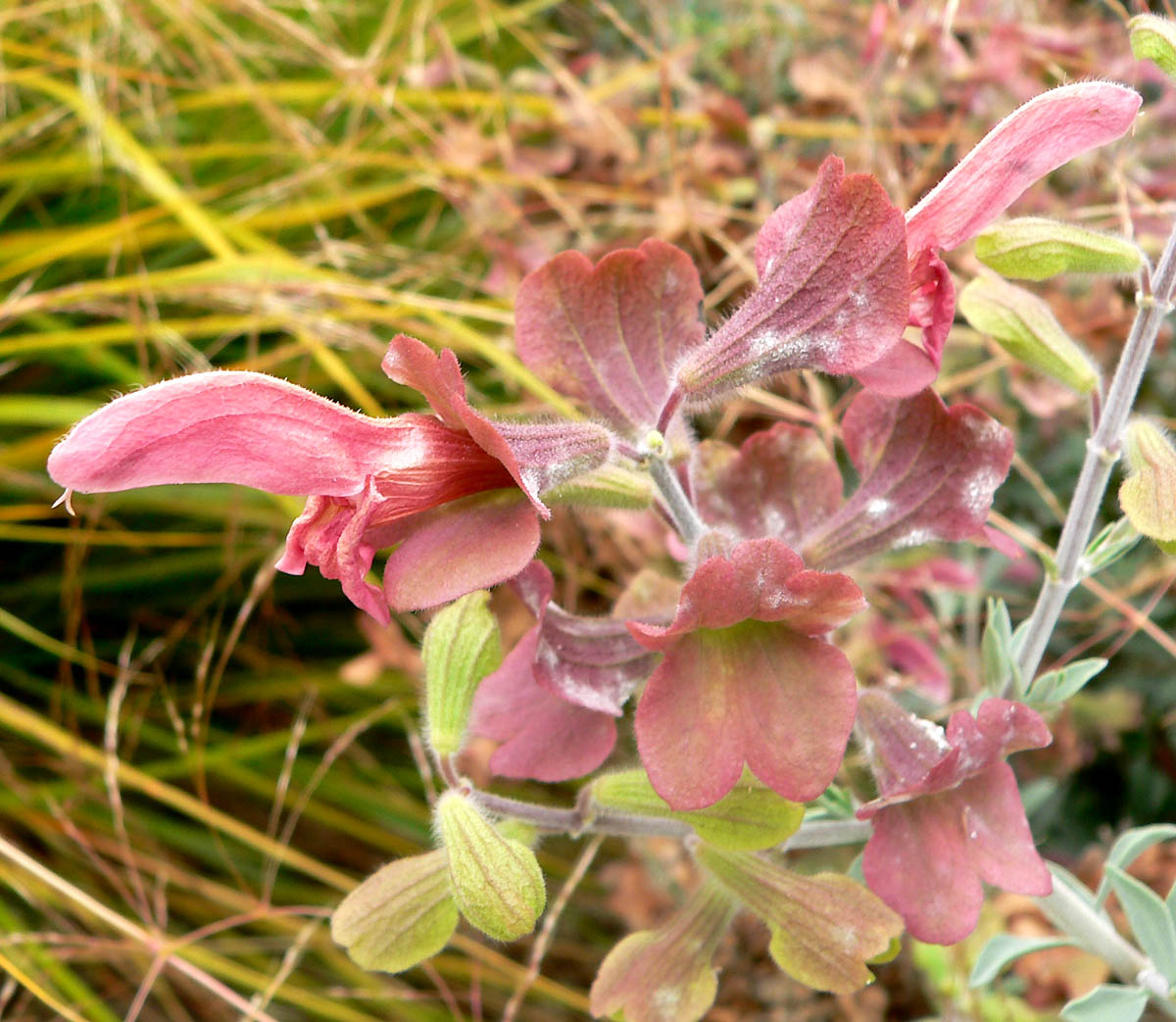
Salvia lanceolata

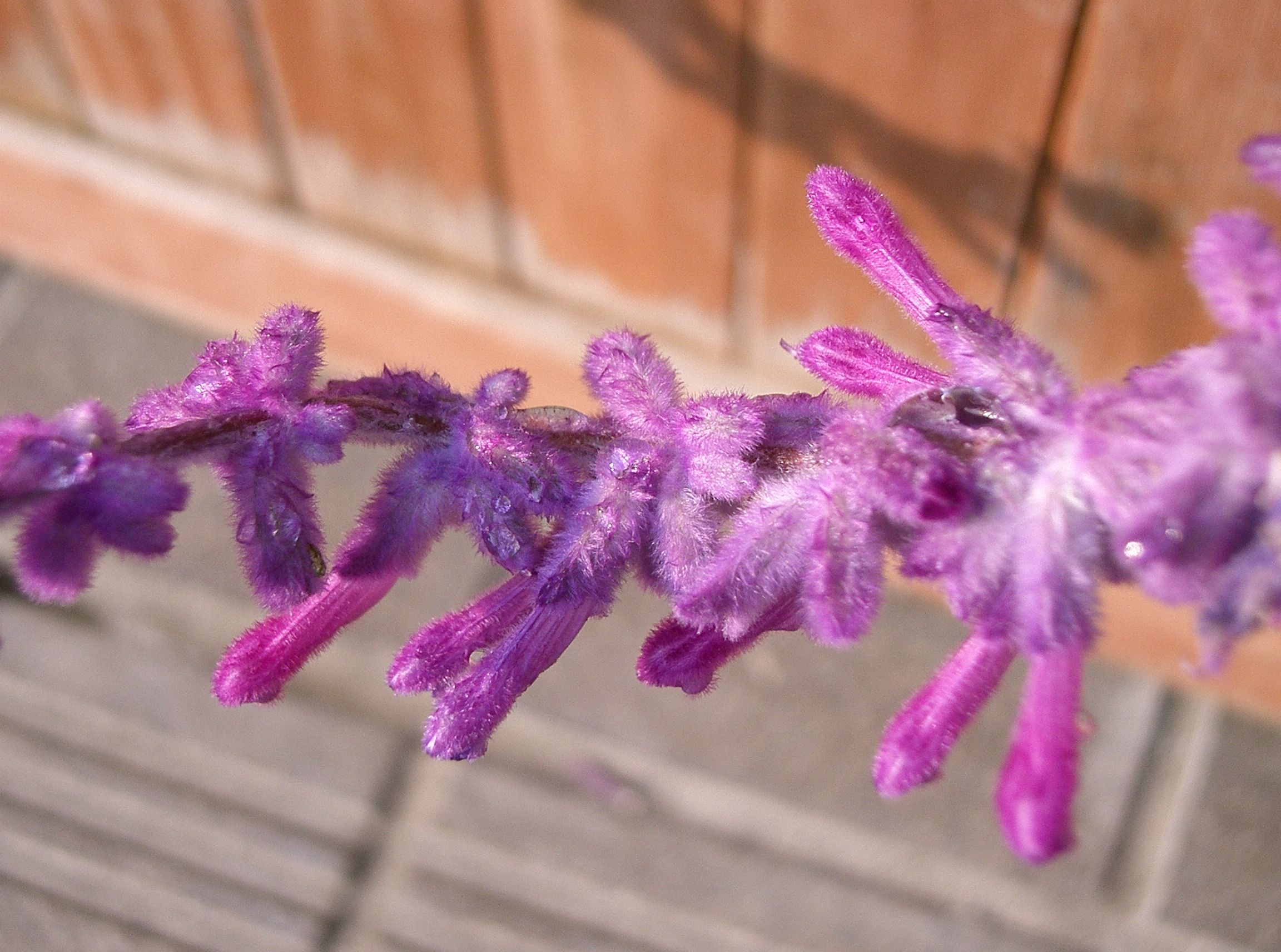
Salvia leucantha

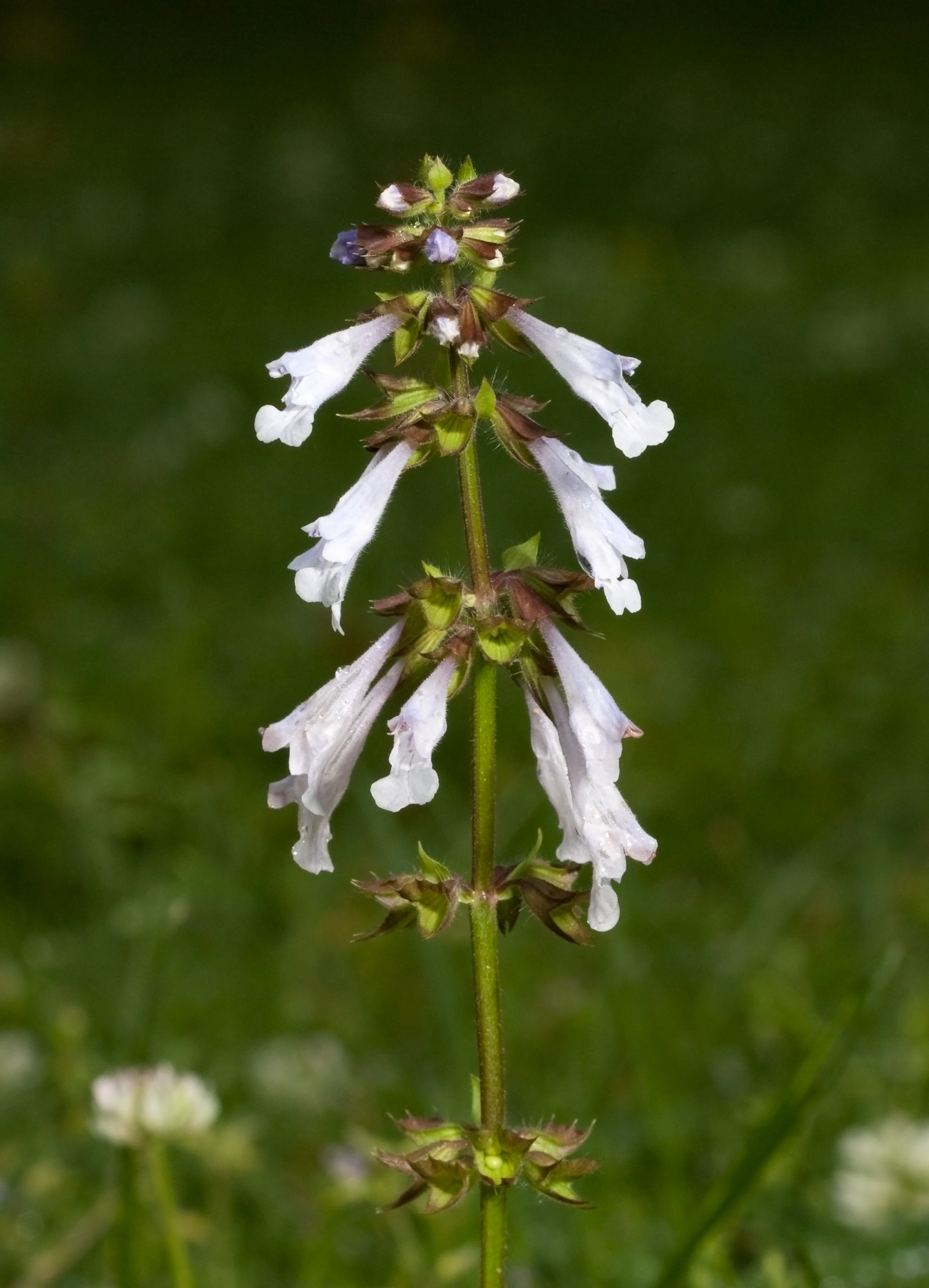
Salvia lyrata

- Salvia lachnaioclada Briq.
- Salvia lachnocalyx Hedge
- Salvia lachnostachys Benth.
- Salvia lachnostoma Epling
- Salvia laevis Benth.
- Salvia lagochila T.Wang & L.Wang
- Salvia lamiifolia Jacq.
- Salvia lanceolata Lam.
- Salvia langlassei Fernald
- Salvia languidula Epling
- Salvia lanicalyx Epling
- Salvia lanicaulis Epling & Játiva
- Salvia lanigera Poir.
- Salvia lankongensis C.Y.Wu
- Salvia lapazana B.L.Turner
- Salvia lasiantha Benth.
- Salvia lasiocephala Hook. & Arn.
- Salvia lavandula Alain
- Salvia lavanduloides Kunth
- Salvia laxispicata Epling
- Salvia leninae Epling
- Salvia leonia Benth.
- Salvia leonuroides Gloxin
- Salvia leptostachys Benth.
- Salvia leriifolia Benth.
- Salvia leucantha Cav.
- Salvia leucocephala Kunth
- Salvia leucochlamys Epling
- Salvia leucodermis Baker
- Salvia leucophylla Greene
- Salvia libanensis Rusby
- Salvia liguliloba Y.Z.Sun
- Salvia lilacinocoerulea Nevski
- Salvia limbata C.A.Mey.
- Salvia lineata Benth.
- Salvia littae Vis.
- Salvia lobbii Epling
- Salvia longibracteolata E.P.Santos
- Salvia longipedicellata Hedge
- Salvia longispicata M.Martens & Galeotti
- Salvia longistyla Benth.
- Salvia lophanthoides Fernald
- Salvia loxensis Benth.
- Salvia lozanoi Fernald
- Salvia luteistriata G.X.Hu, E.D.Liu & C.L.Xiang
- Salvia lutescens (Koidz.) Koidz.
- Salvia lycioides A.Gray
- Salvia lyrata L.

== M ==
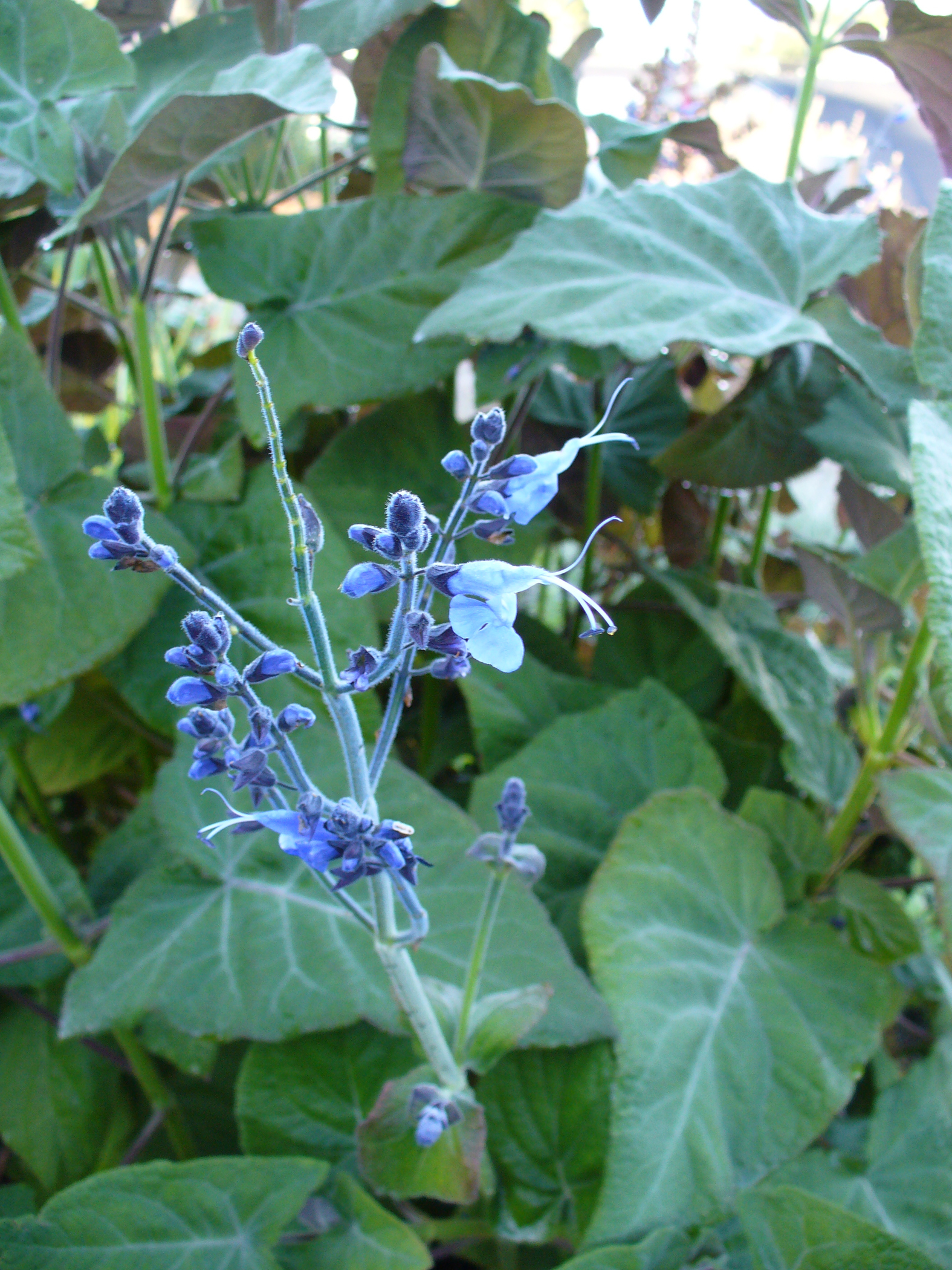
Salvia macrophylla

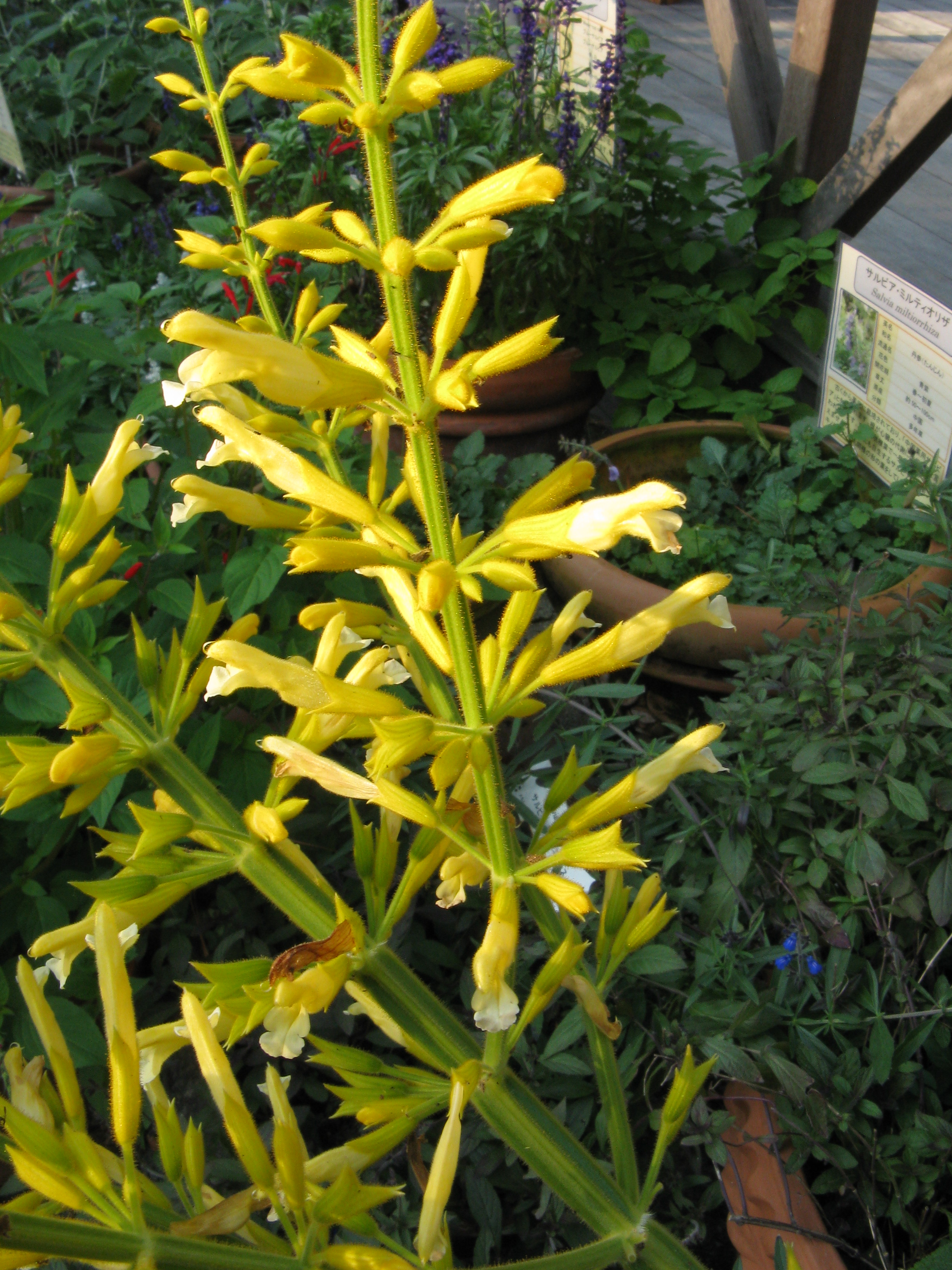
Salvia madrensis

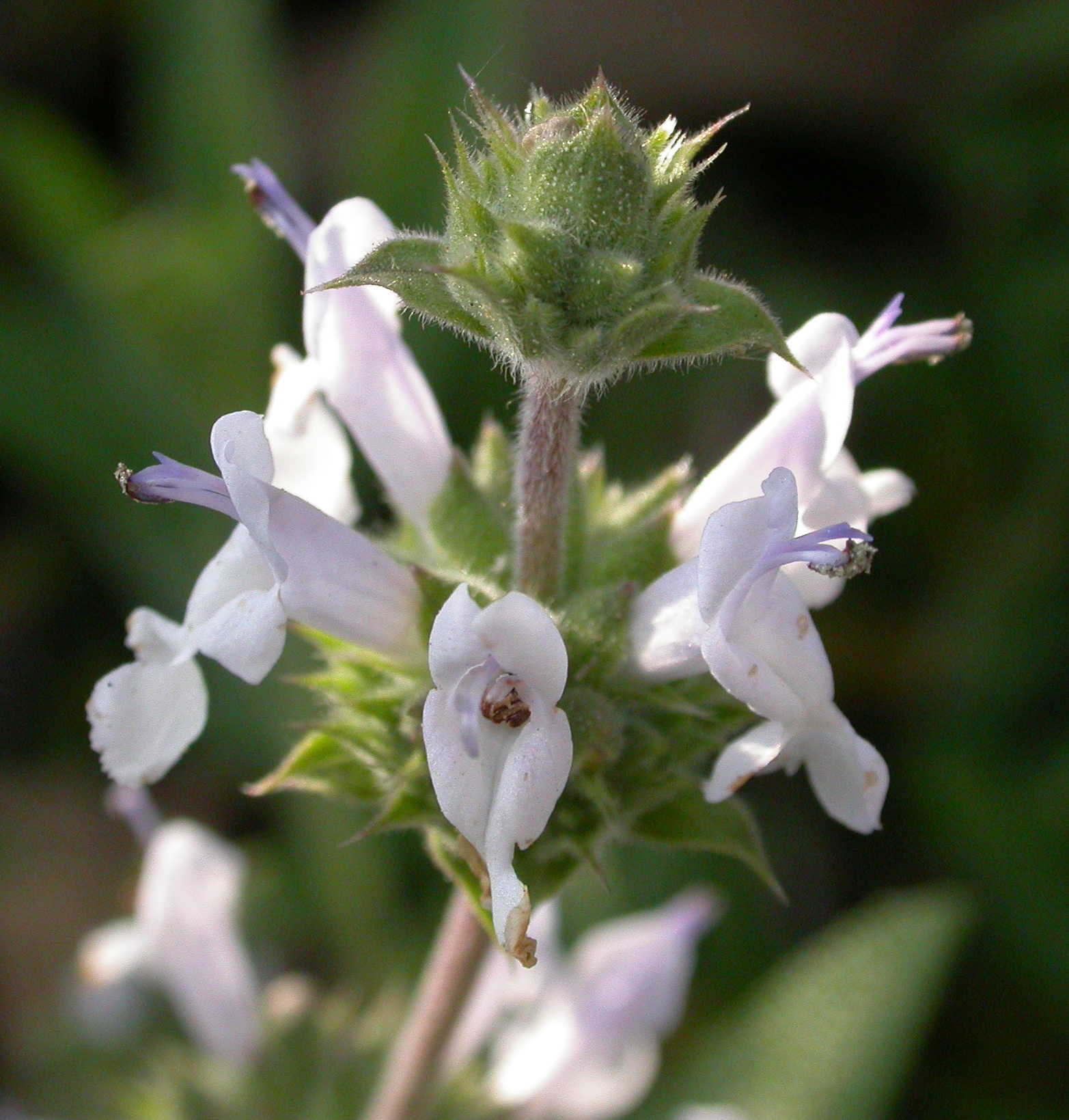
Salvia mellifera

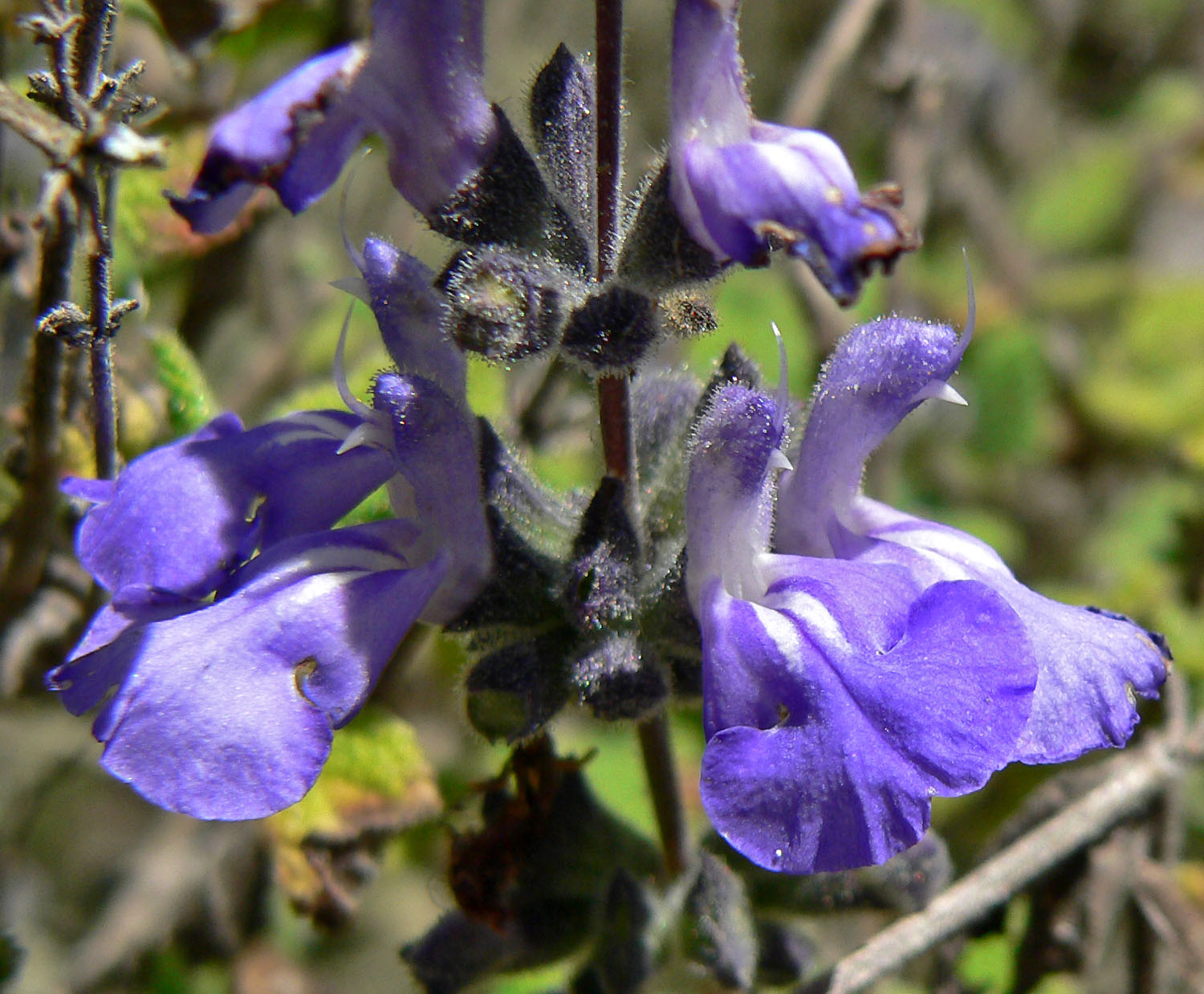
Salvia melissodora

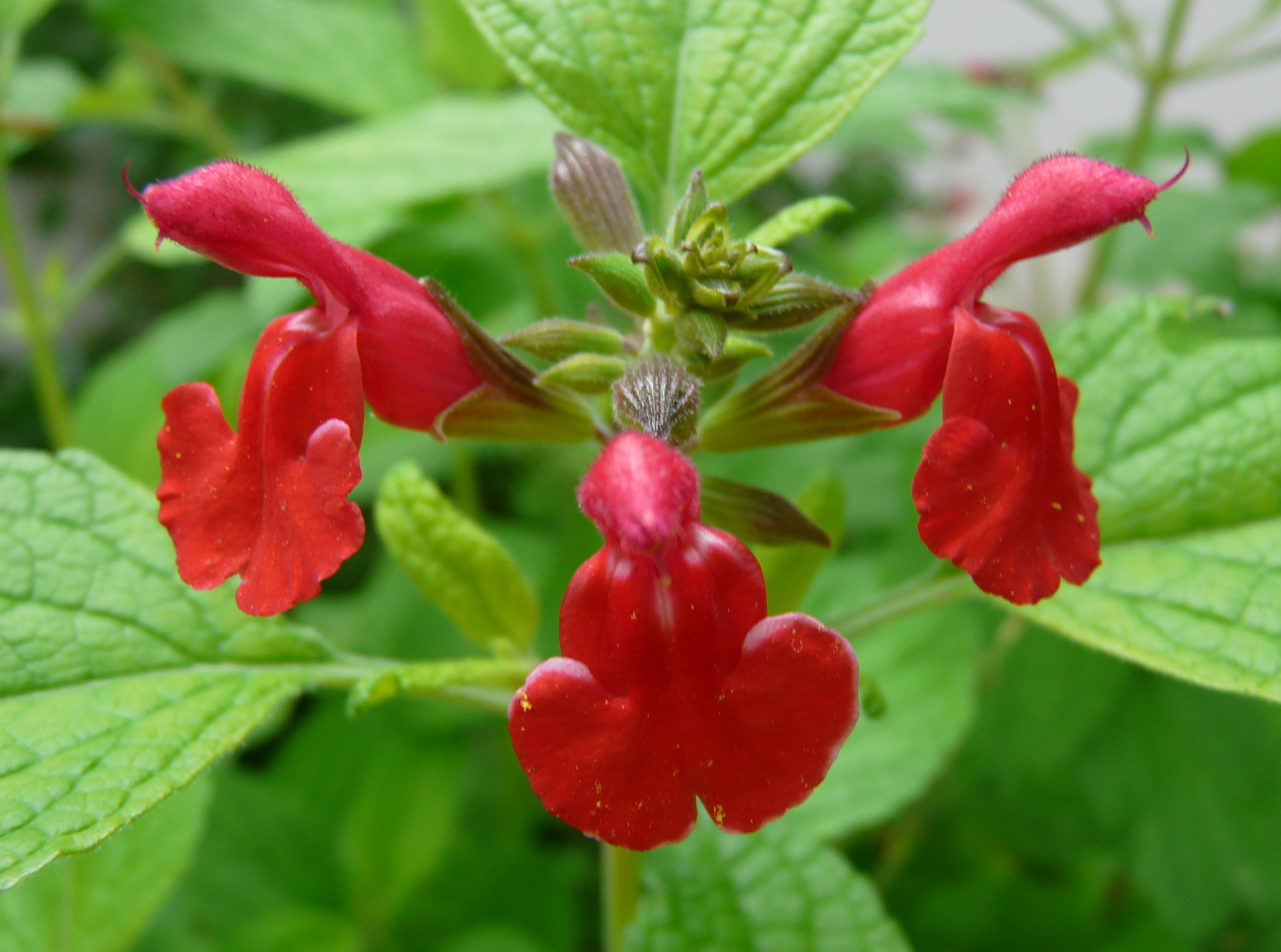
Salvia microphylla

- Salvia macellaria Epling
- Salvia macilenta Boiss.
- Salvia macrocalyx Gardner
- Salvia macrochlamys Boiss. & Kotschy
- Salvia macrophylla Benth.
- Salvia macrosiphon Boiss.
- Salvia macrostachya Kunth
- Salvia madrensis Seem.
- Salvia madrigalii Zamudio & Bedolla
- Salvia mairei H.Lév.
- Salvia majdae (Rech.f. & Wendelbo) Sytsma
- Salvia malvifolia Epling & Játiva
- Salvia manantlanensis Ramamoorthy
- Salvia manasluensis Pendry & Y.K.Wei
- Salvia manaurica Fern.Alonso
- Salvia marashica Ilçim, Celep & Dogan
- Salvia marci Epling
- Salvia margaritae Botsch.
- Salvia mattogrossensis Pilg.
- Salvia maximowicziana Hemsl.
- Salvia maymanica Hedge
- Salvia mayorii Briq.
- Salvia mazatlanensis Fernald
- Salvia mcvaughii Bedolla, Lara Cabrera & Zamudio
- Salvia medusa Epling & Játiva
- Salvia meera Ramamoorthy ex J.G.González & Santana Mich.
- Salvia meiliensis S.W.Su
- Salvia mekongensis E.Peter
- Salvia melaleuca Epling
- Salvia melissiflora Benth.
- Salvia melissodora Lag.
- Salvia mellifera Greene
- Salvia mentiens Pohl
- Salvia merjamie Forssk.
- Salvia mexiae Epling
- Salvia mexicana L.
- Salvia microdictya Urb. & Ekman
- Salvia microphylla Kunth
- Salvia microstegia Boiss. & Balansa
- Salvia miltiorrhiza Bunge
- Salvia minarum Briq.
- Salvia miniata Fernald
- Salvia mirzayanii Rech.f. & Esfand.
- Salvia misella Kunth
- Salvia mocinoi Benth.
- Salvia modesta Boiss.
- Salvia modica Epling
- Salvia mohavensis Greene
- Salvia monantha Brandegee ex Epling
- Salvia monclovensis Fernald
- Salvia moniliformis Fernald
- Salvia montbretii Benth.
- Salvia montecristina Urb. & Ekman
- Salvia moorcroftiana Wall. ex Benth.
- Salvia moranii B.L.Turner
- Salvia mornicola Urb. & Ekman
- Salvia mouretii Batt. & Pit.
- Salvia muelleri Epling
- Salvia muirii L.Bolus
- Salvia multicaulis Vahl
- Salvia munzii Epling
- Salvia muratae T.Yamaz.
- Salvia muscarioides Fernald

== N ==
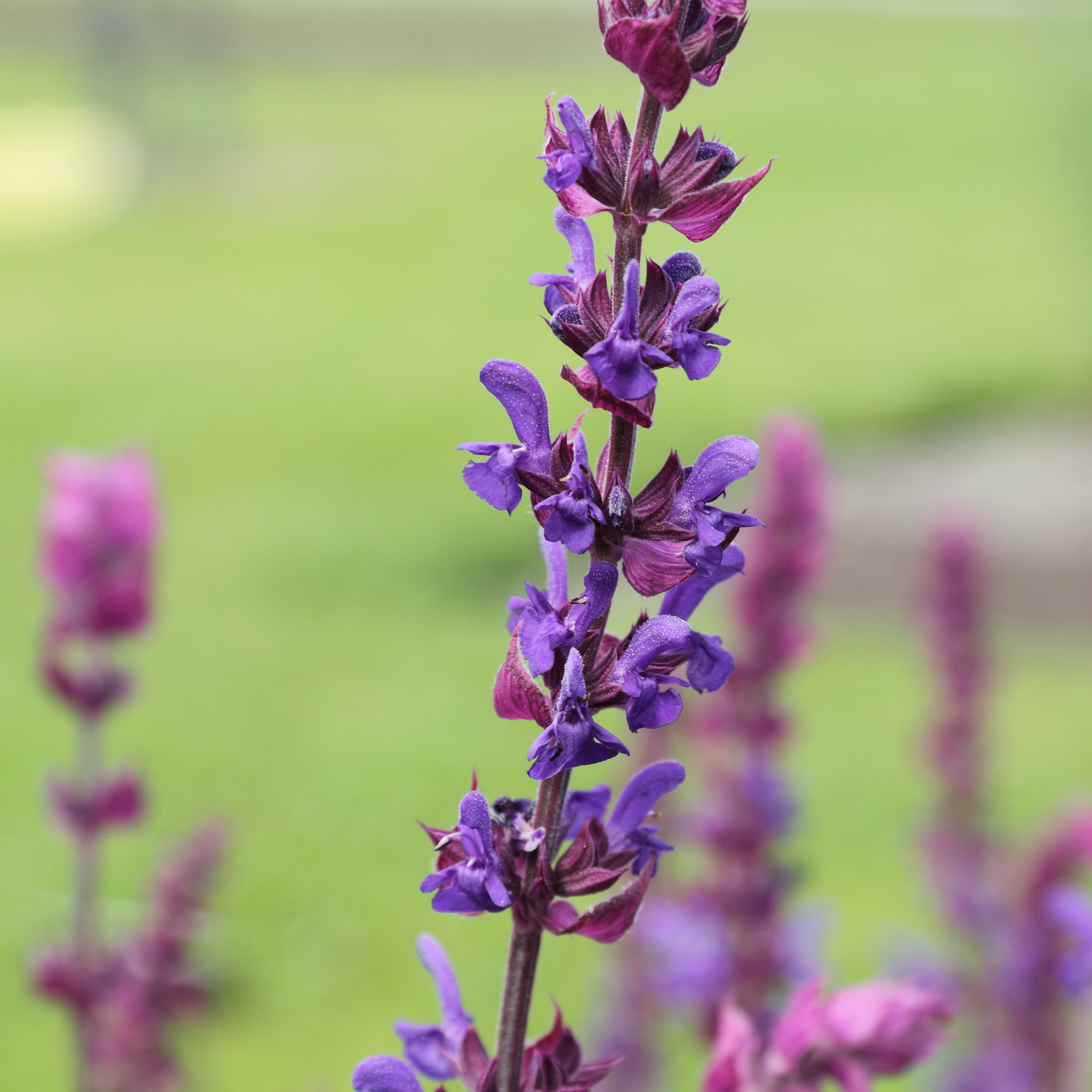
Salvia nemorosa

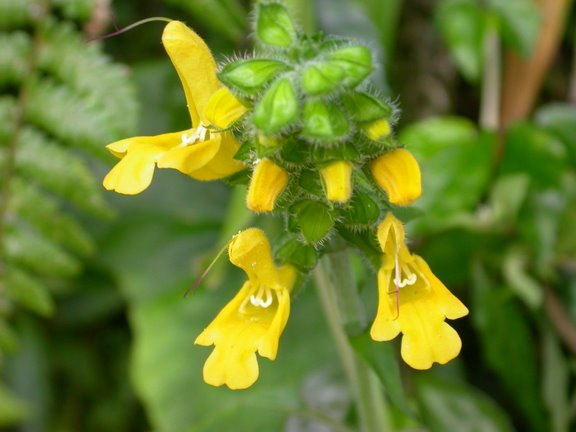
Salvia nipponica

- Salvia namaensis Schinz
- Salvia nana Kunth
- Salvia nanchuanensis Y.Z.Sun
- Salvia napifolia Jacq.
- Salvia nazalena Hedge & Mouterde
- Salvia nemoralis Dusén ex Epling
- Salvia nemorosa L.
- Salvia neovidensis Benth.
- Salvia nervata M.Martens & Galeotti
- Salvia nervosa Benth.
- Salvia nilotica Juss. ex Jacq.
- Salvia nipponica Miq.
- Salvia nitida (M.Martens & Galeotti) Benth.
- Salvia novoleontis B.L.Turner
- Salvia nubicola Wall. ex Sweet
- Salvia nubigena J.R.I.Wood & Harley
- Salvia nubilorum Játiva & Epling
- Salvia nutans L.
- Salvia nydeggeri Hub.-Mor.

== O ==
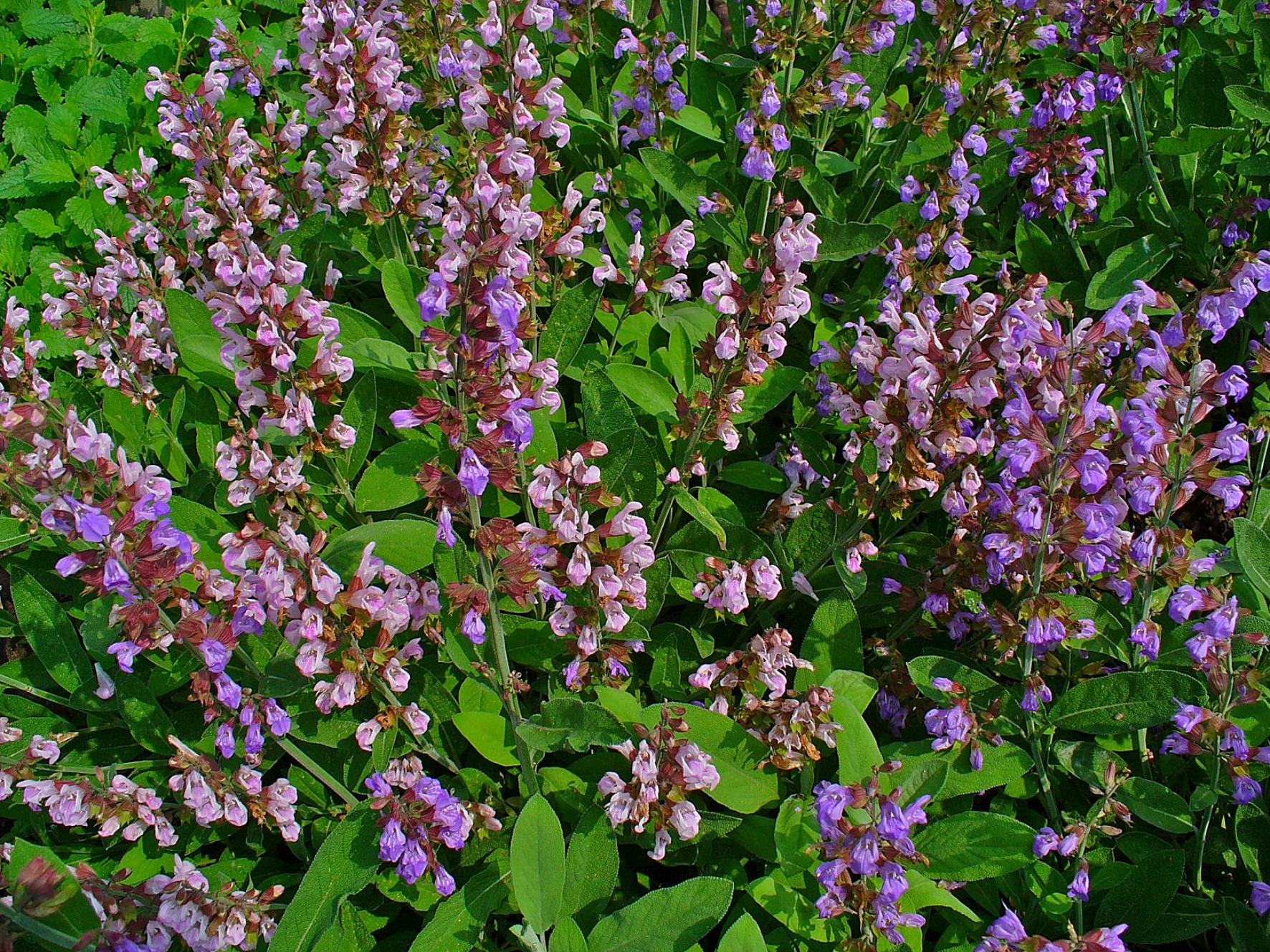
Salvia officinalis

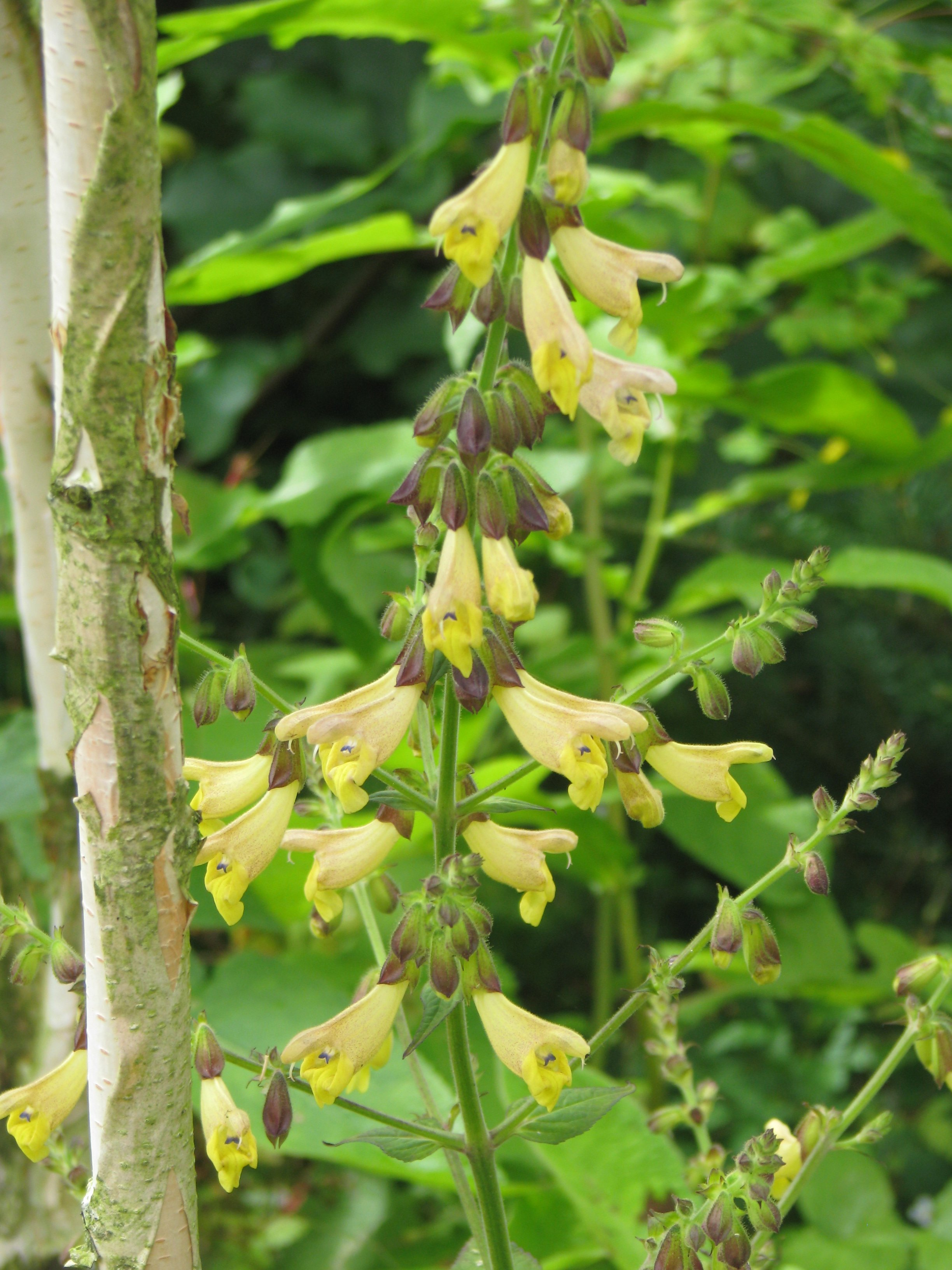
Salvia omeiana

- Salvia oaxacana Fernald
- Salvia oblongifolia M.Martens & Galeotti
- Salvia obtorta Epling
- Salvia obtusata Thunb.
- Salvia obumbrata Epling
- Salvia occidentalis Sw.
- Salvia occidua Epling
- Salvia occultiflora Epling
- Salvia ochrantha Epling
- Salvia ocimifolia Epling
- Salvia odam J.G.González
- Salvia odontochlamys Hedge
- Salvia officinalis L.
- Salvia oligantha Dusén
- Salvia oligophylla Aucher ex Benth.
- Salvia ombrophila Dusén
- Salvia omeiana E.Peter
- Salvia omerocalyx Hayata
- Salvia omissa J.G.González
- Salvia opertiflora Epling
- Salvia ophiocephala J.R.I.Wood
- Salvia oppositiflora Ruiz & Pav.
- Salvia orbignaei Benth.
- Salvia oreopola Fernald
- Salvia oresbia Fernald
- Salvia orthostachys Epling
- Salvia ovalifolia A.St.-Hil. ex Benth.
- Salvia oxyphora Briq.
- Salvia ozolotepecensis J.G.González & Fragoso

== P ==
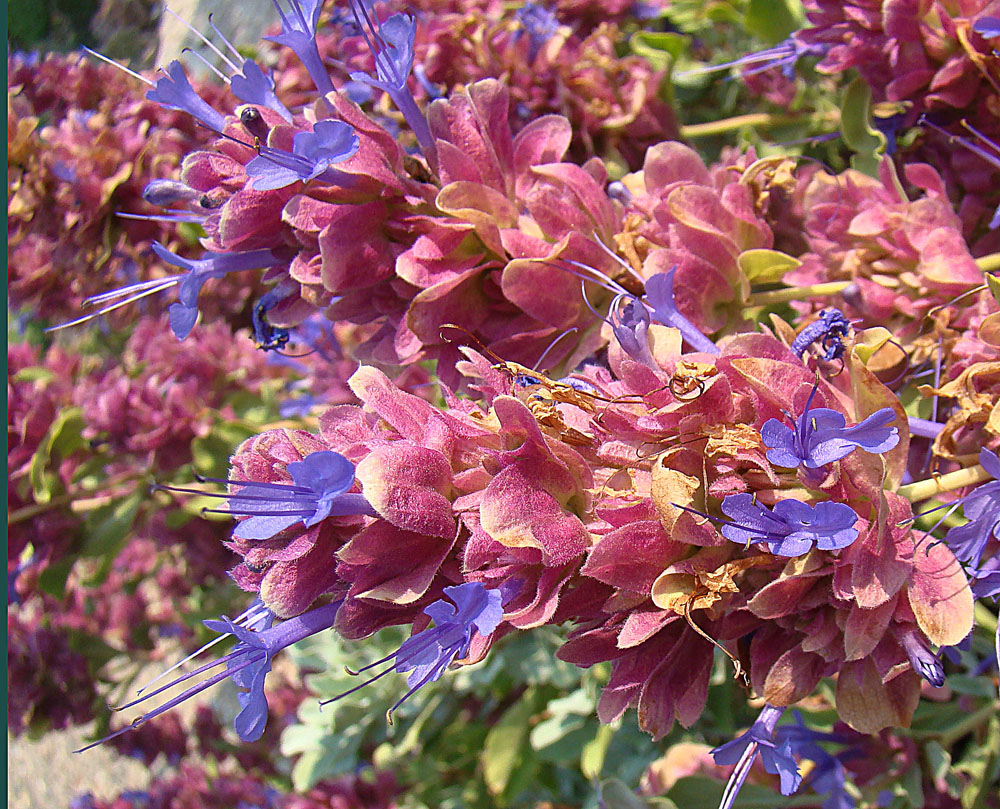
Salvia pachyphylla

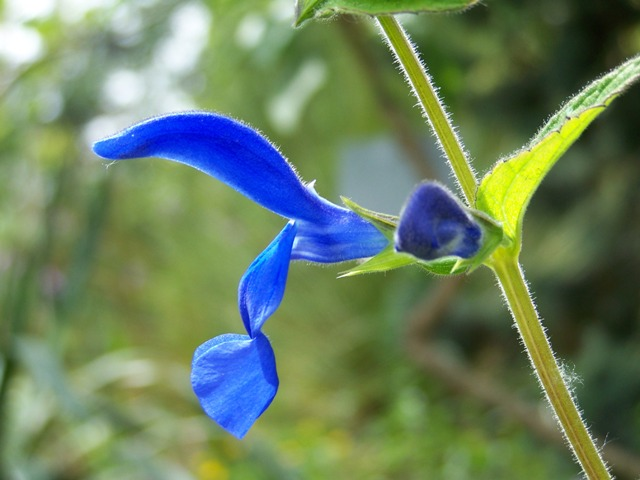
Salvia patens

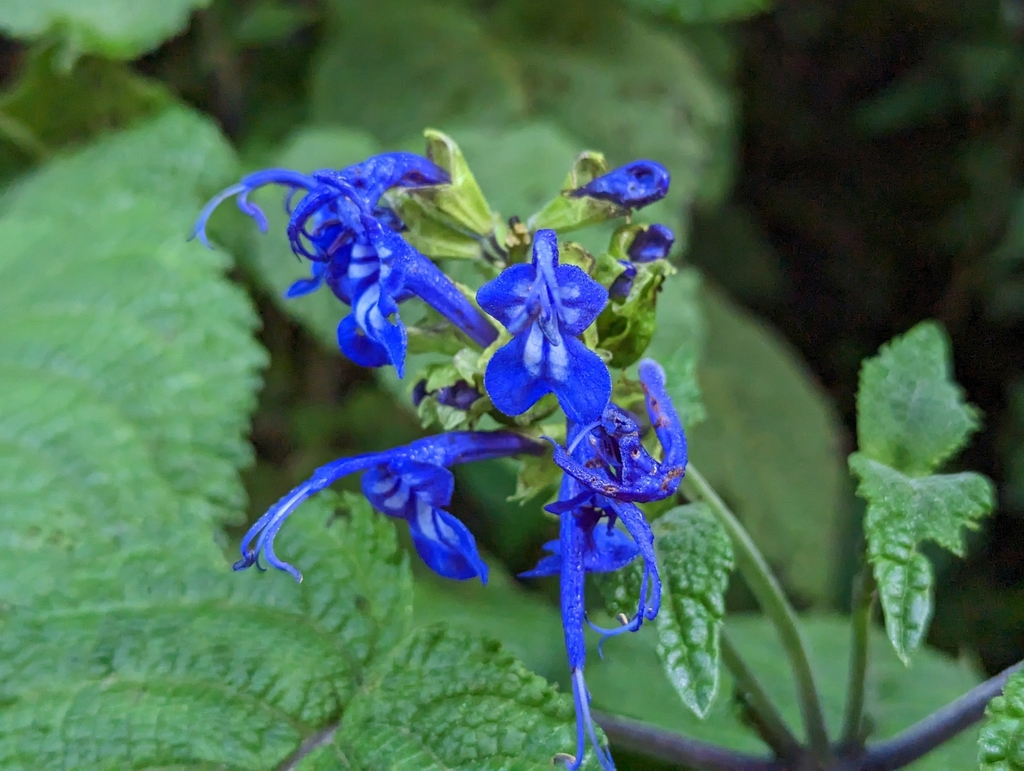
Salvia pichinchensis

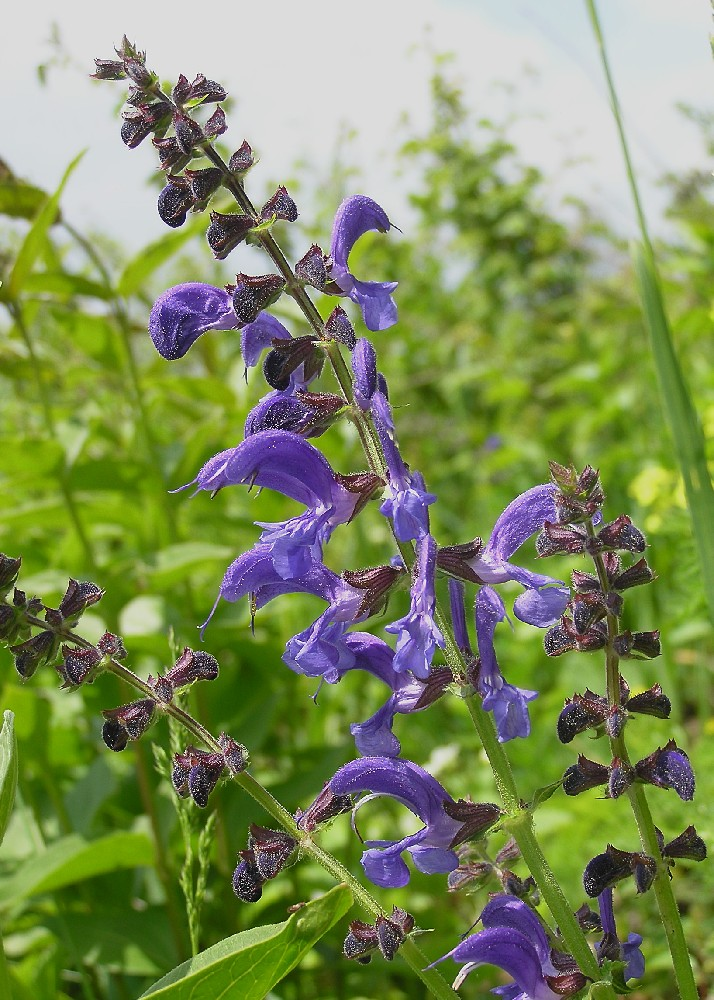
Salvia pratensis

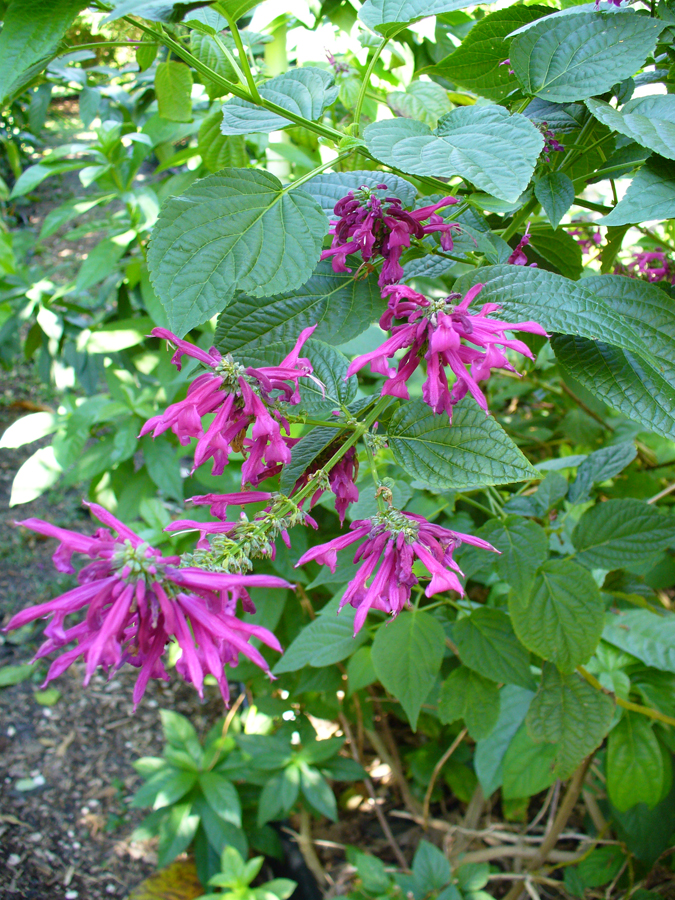
Salvia purpurea

- Salvia pachyphylla Epling ex Munz
- Salvia pachypoda Briq.
- Salvia pachystachya Trautv.
- Salvia palaestina Benth.
- Salvia palealis Epling
- Salvia palifolia Kunth
- Salvia pallida Benth.
- Salvia palmeri A.Gray
- Salvia palmetorum J.G.González & Carnahan
- Salvia pamplonitana Fern.Alonso
- Salvia pannosa Fernald
- Salvia pansamalensis Donn.Sm.
- Salvia paohsingensis C.Y.Wu
- Salvia paposana Phil.
- Salvia paraguariensis Briq.
- Salvia paramicola Fern.Alonso
- Salvia paramiltiorrhiza H.W.Li & X.L.Huang
- Salvia parciflora Urb.
- Salvia parryi A.Gray
- Salvia parvifolia Baker
- Salvia paryskii Skean & Judd
- Salvia patens Cav.
- Salvia patriciae J.G.González & Martínez-Ambr.
- Salvia pauciserrata Benth.
- Salvia paulwalleri B.L.Turner
- Salvia paupercula Epling
- Salvia pavonii Benth.
- Salvia penduliflora Epling
- Salvia peninsularis Brandegee
- Salvia pennellii Epling
- Salvia pentstemonoides Kunth & C.D.Bouché
- Salvia peratica Paine
- Salvia perblanda Epling
- Salvia peregrina Epling
- Salvia pericona B.L.Turner
- Salvia perlonga Fernald
- Salvia perlucida Epling
- Salvia perplicata Epling
- Salvia perrieri Hedge
- Salvia persepolitana Boiss.
- Salvia persicifolia A.St.-Hil. ex Benth.
- Salvia personata Epling
- Salvia petrophila G.X.Hu, E.D.Liu & Yan Liu
- Salvia pexa Epling
- Salvia peyronii Boiss. ex Post
- Salvia phaenostemma Donn.Sm.
- Salvia phlomoides Asso
- Salvia piasezkii Maxim.
- Salvia pichinchensis Benth.
- Salvia pilifera Montbret & Aucher ex Benth.
- Salvia pineticola Epling
- Salvia pinguifolia (Fernald) Wooton & Standl.
- Salvia pinnata L.
- Salvia pisidica Boiss. & Heldr. ex Benth.
- Salvia platycheila A.Gray
- Salvia platyphylla Briq.
- Salvia plebeia R.Br.
- Salvia plectranthoides Griff.
- Salvia plumosa Ruiz & Pav.
- Salvia plurispicata Epling
- Salvia pobedimovae J.G.González
- Salvia poculata Nábelek
- Salvia podadena Briq.
- Salvia pogonochila Diels ex Limpr.
- Salvia polystachia Cav.
- Salvia pomifera L.
- Salvia porphyrocalyx Baker
- Salvia potaninii Krylov
- Salvia potentillifolia Boiss. & Heldr. ex Benth.
- Salvia potus Epling
- Salvia praestans Epling
- Salvia praeterita Epling
- Salvia prasiifolia Benth.
- Salvia pratensis L.
- Salvia prattii Hemsl.
- Salvia prilipkoana Grossh. & Sosn.
- Salvia primuliformis Epling
- Salvia pringlei B.L.Rob. & Greenm.
- Salvia prionitis Hance
- Salvia procurrens Benth.
- Salvia propinqua Benth.
- Salvia prostrata Hook.f.
- Salvia protracta Benth.
- Salvia pruinosa Fernald
- Salvia prunelloides Kunth
- Salvia prunifolia Fernald
- Salvia przewalskii Maxim.
- Salvia pseudeuphratica Rech.f.
- Salvia pseudoincisa Epling
- Salvia pseudojaminiana A.Chev.
- Salvia pseudomisella Moran & G.A.Levin
- Salvia pseudopallida Epling
- Salvia pseudorosmarinus Epling
- Salvia psilantha Epling
- Salvia psilostachya Epling
- Salvia pterocalyx Hedge
- Salvia pteroura Briq.
- Salvia puberula Fernald
- Salvia pubescens Benth.
- Salvia pugana J.G.González & Art.Castro
- Salvia pulchella DC.
- Salvia punctata Ruiz & Pav.
- Salvia punicans Epling
- Salvia purepecha Bedolla, Lara Cabrera & Zamudio
- Salvia purpurea Cav.
- Salvia purpusii Brandegee
- Salvia pusilla Fernald
- Salvia pygmaea Matsum.

== Q ==
- Salvia qimenensis S.W.Su & J.Q.He
- Salvia quercetorum Epling
- Salvia quezelii Hedge & Afzal-Rafii
- Salvia quitensis Benth.

== R ==
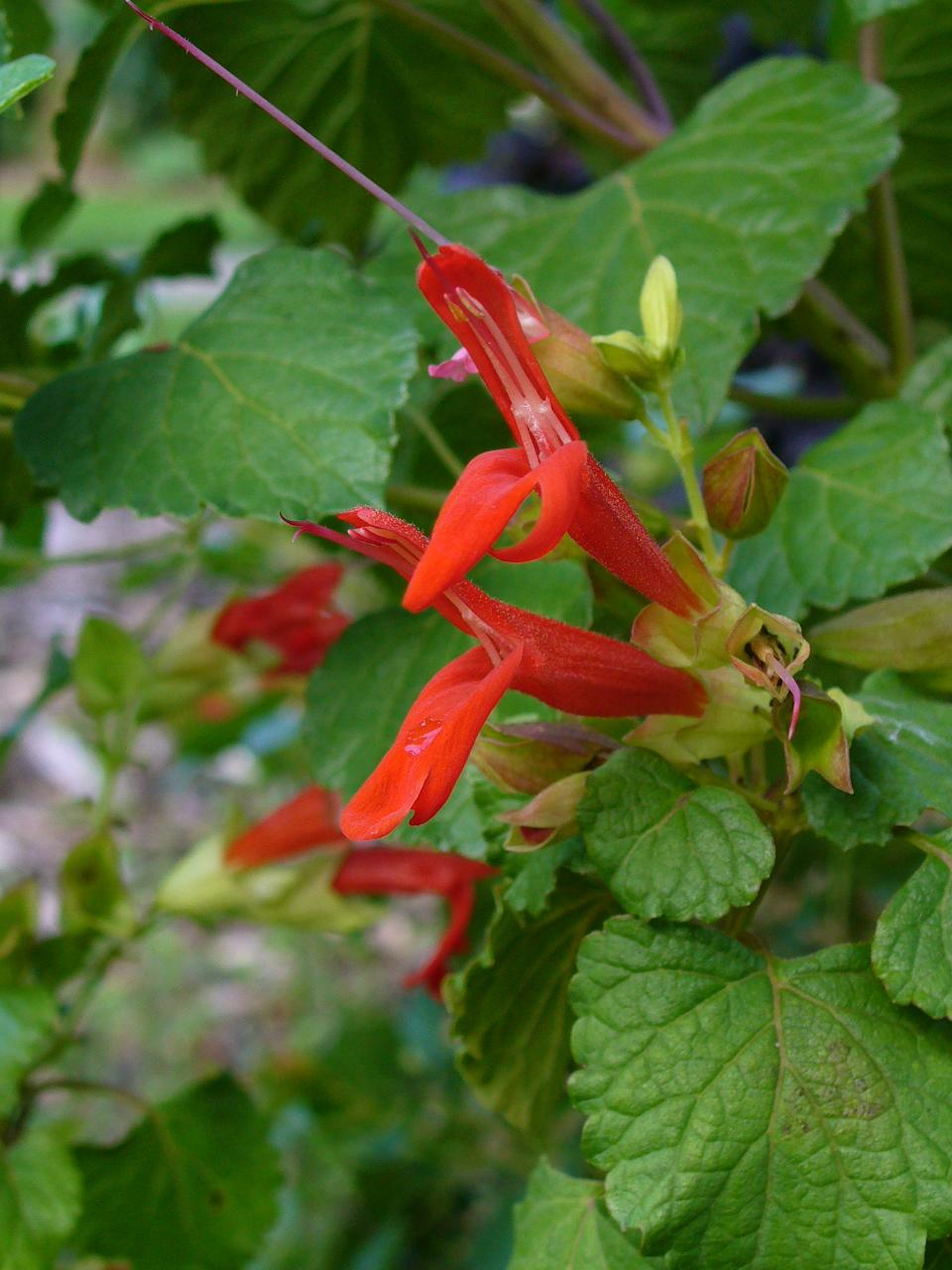
Salvia regla

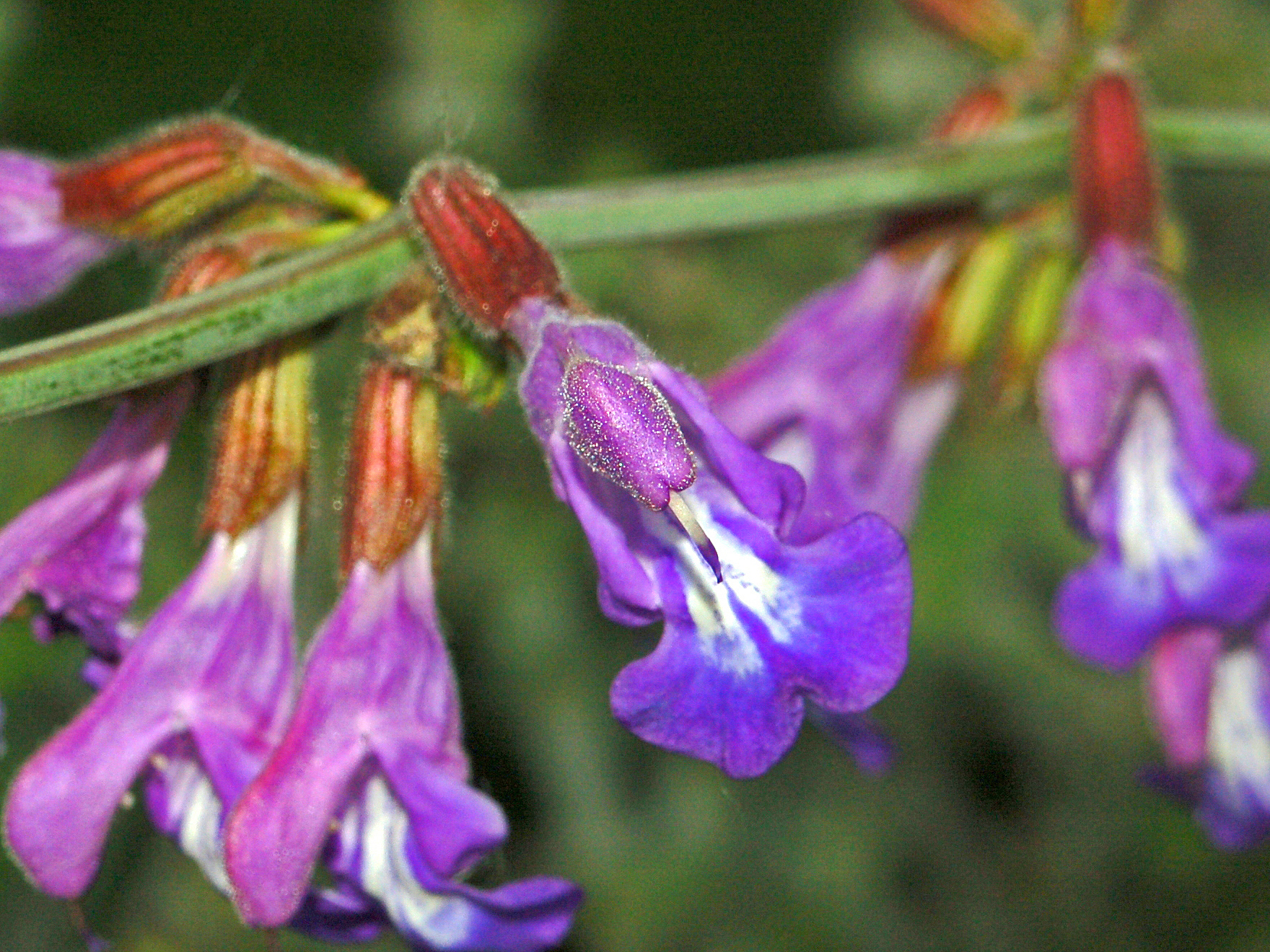
Salvia ringens

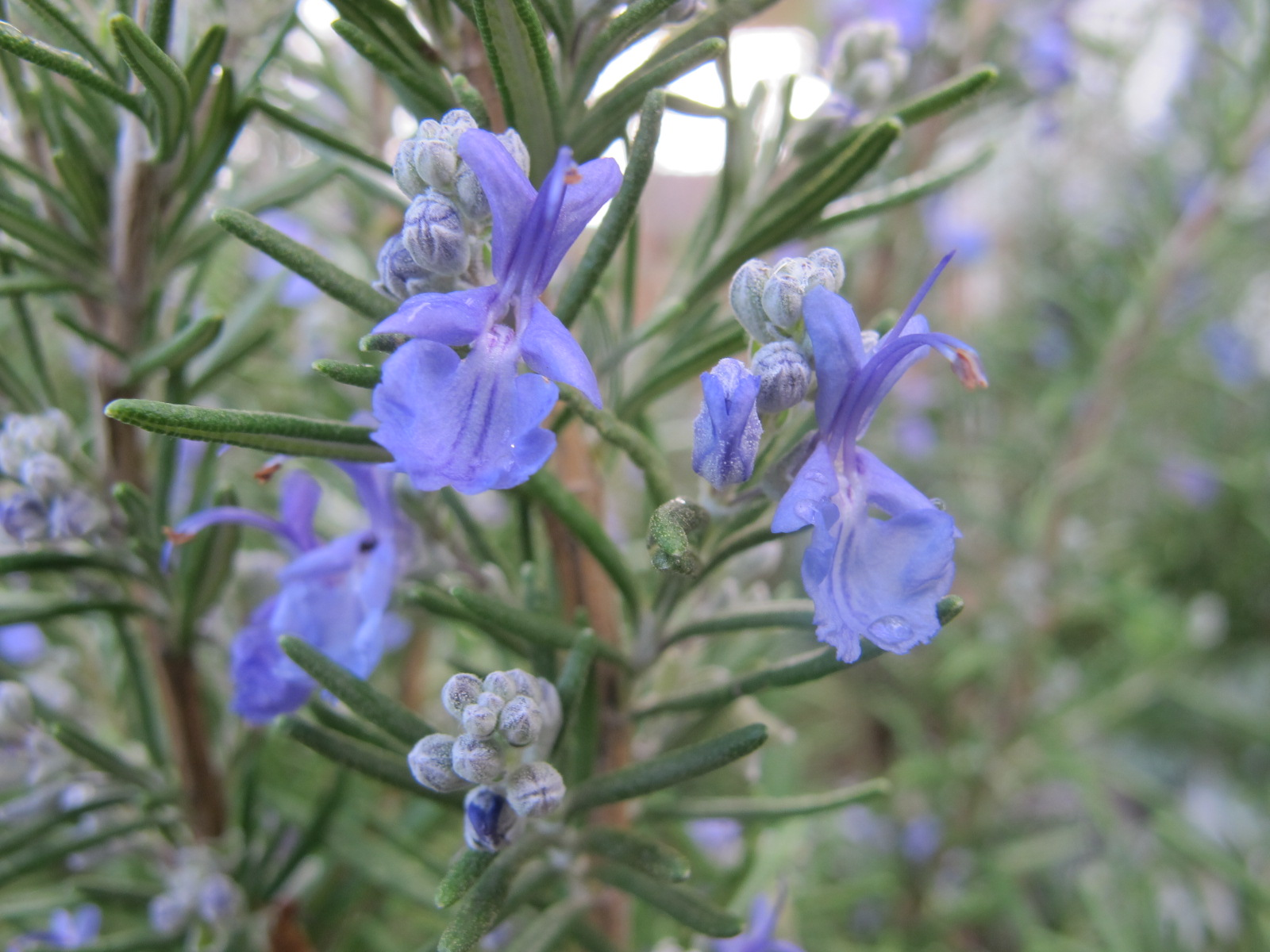
Rosemary, Salvia rosmarinus

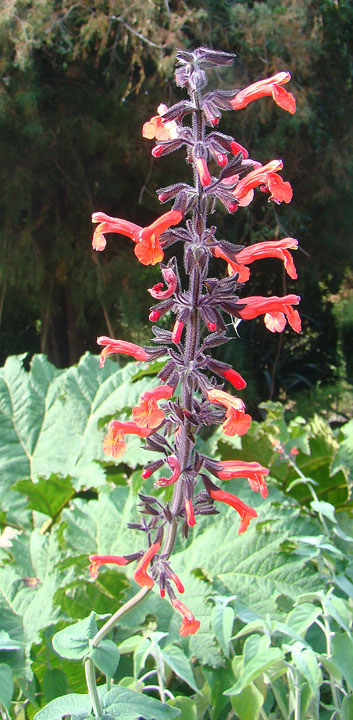
Salvia rubescens

- Salvia radula Benth.
- Salvia ramamoorthyana Espejo
- Salvia ramirezii J.G.González
- Salvia ramosa Brandegee
- Salvia ranzaniana Makino
- Salvia raveniana Ramamoorthy
- Salvia raymondii J.R.I.Wood
- Salvia rechingeri Hedge
- Salvia recognita Fisch. & C.A.Mey.
- Salvia recurva Benth.
- Salvia reeseana Hedge & Hub.-Mor.
- Salvia reflexa Hornem.
- Salvia reginae J.G.González & J.H.Vega
- Salvia regla Cav.
- Salvia regnelliana Briq.
- Salvia reitzii Epling
- Salvia remota Benth.
- Salvia repens Burch. ex Benth.
- Salvia reptans Jacq.
- Salvia retinervia Briq.
- Salvia reuteriana Boiss.
- Salvia revelata Mátis & A.Z.Szabó
- Salvia revoluta Ruiz & Pav.
- Salvia rhizomatosa J.G.González, Art.Castro & H.Ávila
- Salvia rhodostephana Epling
- Salvia rhombifolia Ruiz & Pav.
- Salvia rhytidea Benth.
- Salvia richardsonii B.L.Turner
- Salvia ringens Sm.
- Salvia rivularis Gardner
- Salvia robertoana Mart.Gord. & Fragoso
- Salvia roborowskii Maxim.
- Salvia roemeriana Scheele
- Salvia rogersiana Ramamoorthy ex J.G.González & Cuevas
- Salvia roscida Fernald
- Salvia rosei Fernald
- Salvia rosifolia Sm.
- Salvia rosmarinoides A.St.-Hil. ex Benth.
- Salvia rosmarinus Spenn.
- Salvia rostellata Epling
- Salvia rubescens Kunth
- Salvia rubifolia Boiss.
- Salvia rubrifaux Epling
- Salvia rubriflora Epling
- Salvia rubropunctata B.L.Rob. & Fernald
- Salvia rufula Kunth
- Salvia runcinata L.f.
- Salvia rupestris M.Mota & J.F.B.Pastore
- Salvia rusbyi Britton ex Rusby
- Salvia russellii Benth.
- Salvia rypara Briq.
- Salvia rzedowskii Ramamoorthy

== S ==
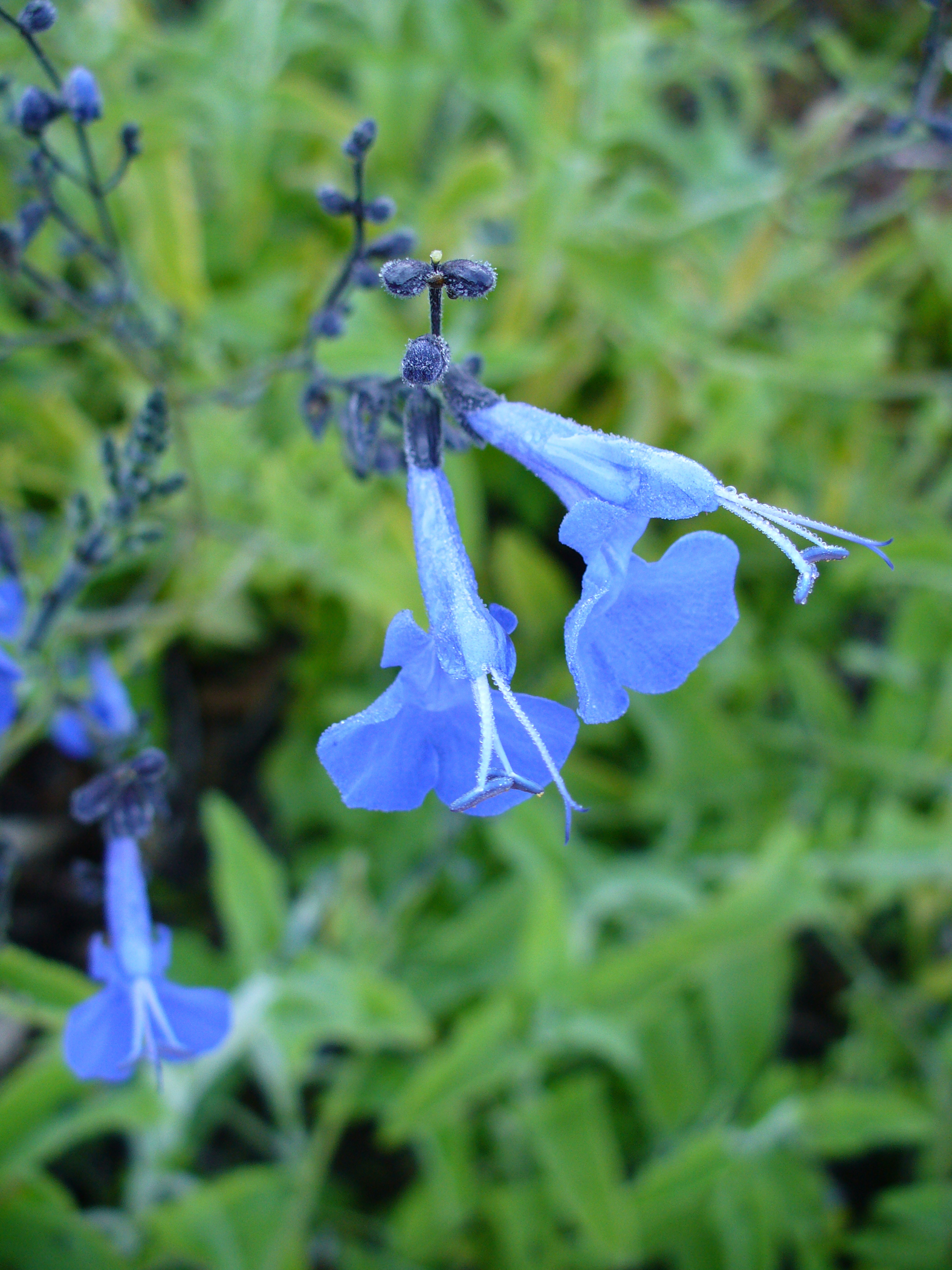
Salvia sagittata

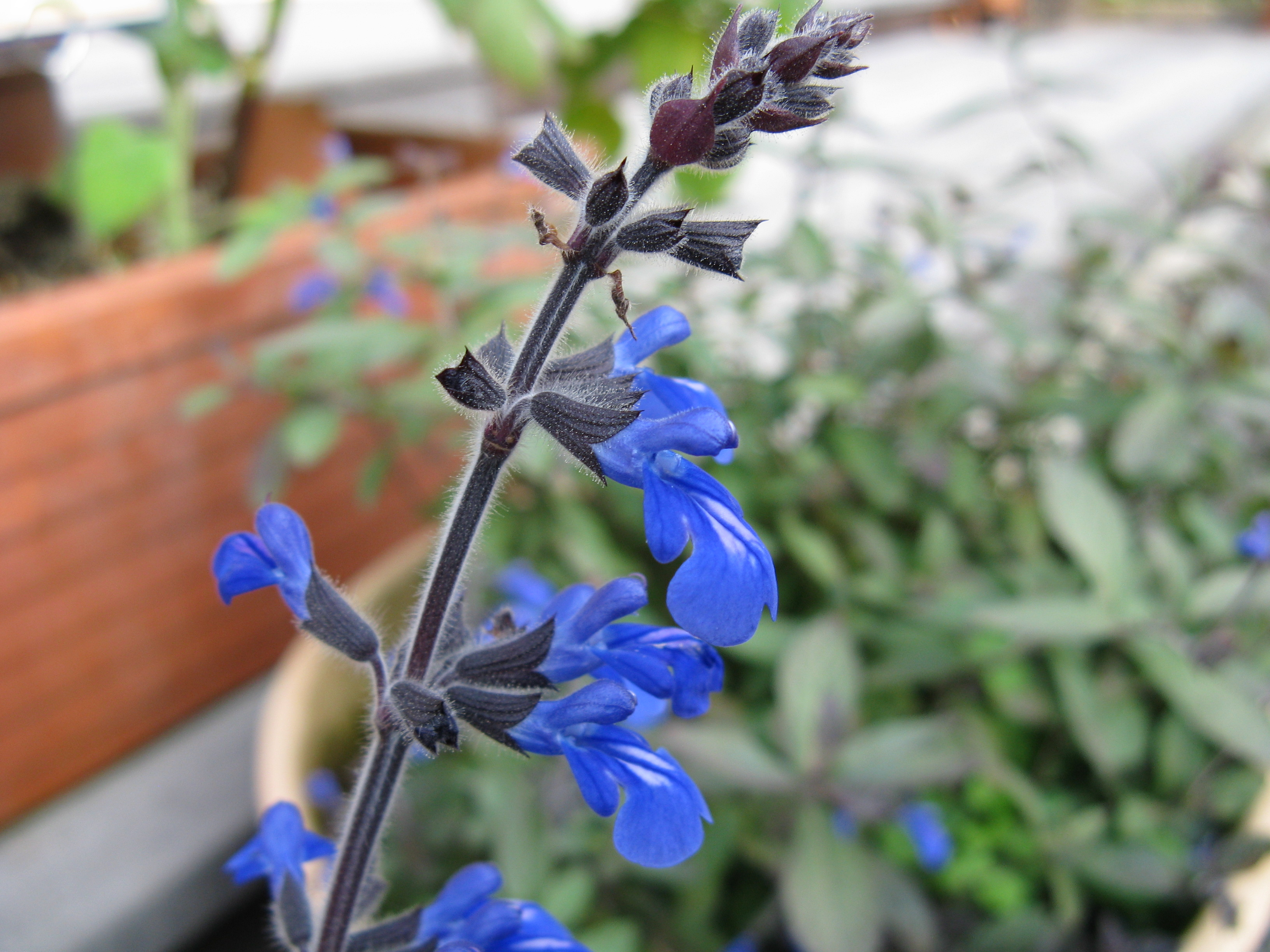
Salvia sinaloensis

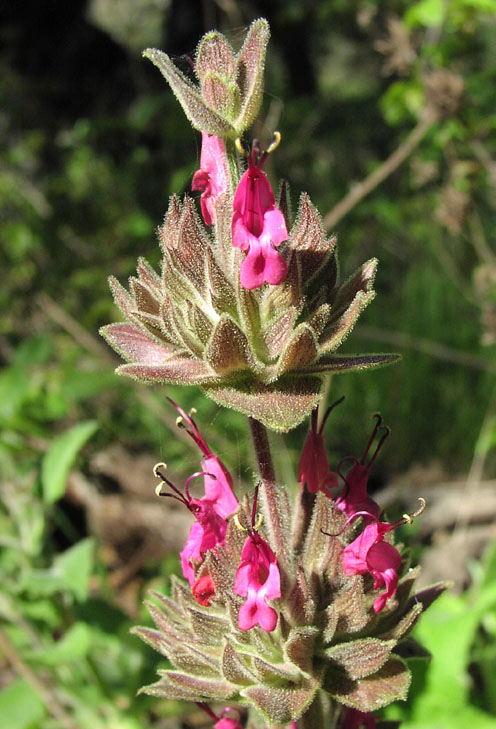
Salvia spathacea

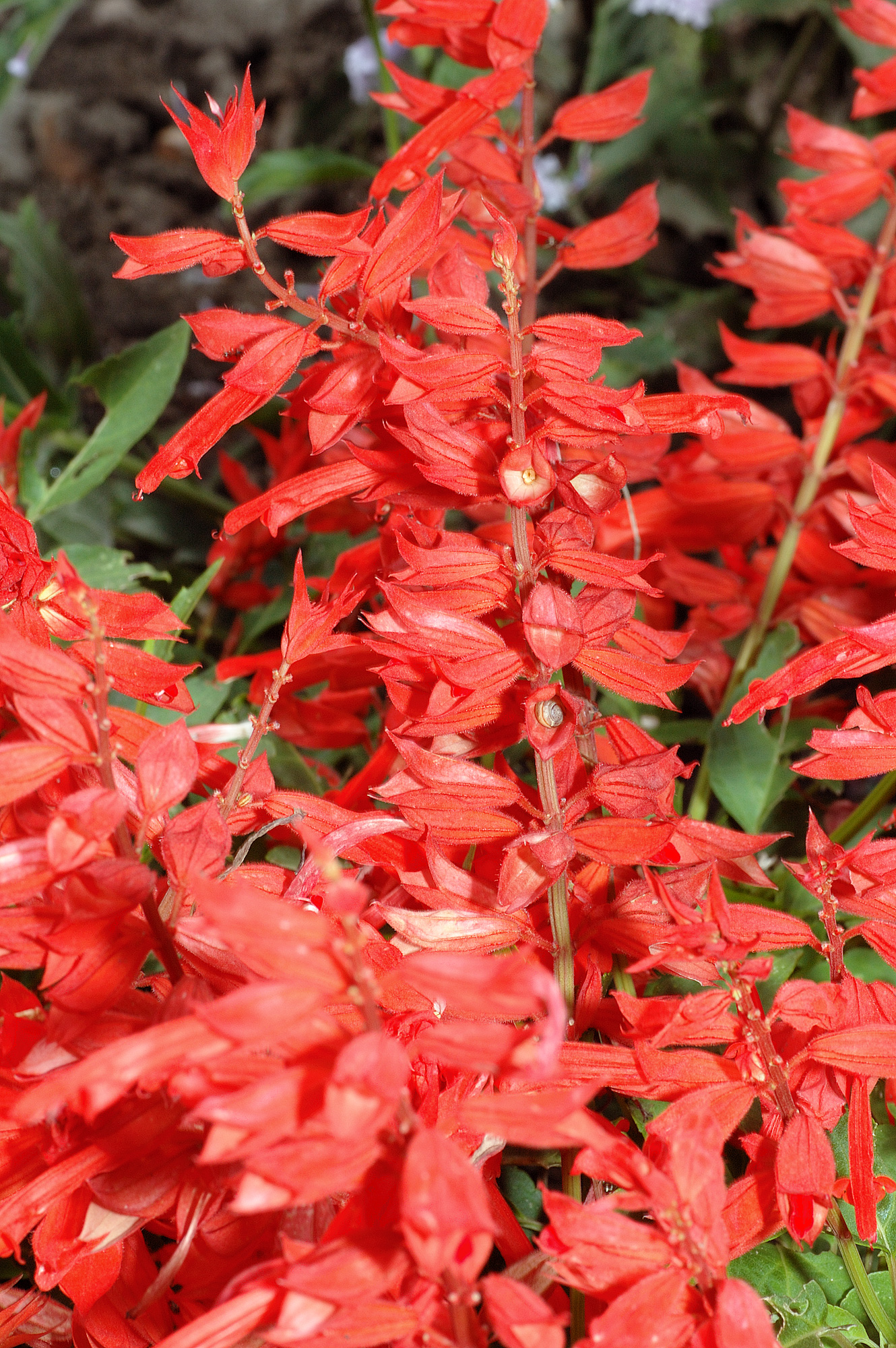
Salvia splendens

- Salvia saccardiana (Pamp.) Del Carr. & Garbari
- Salvia saccifera Urb. & Ekman
- Salvia sacculus Epling
- Salvia sagittata Ruiz & Pav.
- Salvia sahendica Boiss. & Buhse
- Salvia salicifolia Pohl
- Salvia samuelssonii Rech.f.
- Salvia sanctae-luciae Seem.
- Salvia santanae Ramamoorthy ex J.G.González & Guzm.-Hern.
- Salvia santolinifolia Boiss.
- Salvia sarawschanica Regel & Schmalh.
- Salvia sarmentosa Epling
- Salvia saxicola Wall. ex Benth.
- Salvia scabiosifolia Lam.
- Salvia scabra Thunb.
- Salvia scabrata Britton & P.Wilson
- Salvia scabrida Pohl
- Salvia scandens Epling
- Salvia scapiformis Hance
- Salvia scaposa Epling
- Salvia schimperi Benth.
- Salvia schizocalyx E.Peter
- Salvia schizochila E.Peter
- Salvia schlechteri Briq.
- Salvia schmalhausenii Regel
- Salvia sciaphila (J.R.I.Wood & Harley) Fern.Alonso
- Salvia sclarea L.
- Salvia sclareoides Brot.
- Salvia sclareopsis Bornm. ex Hedge
- Salvia scoparia Epling
- Salvia scrophulariifolia (Bunge) B.T.Drew
- Salvia scutellarioides Kunth
- Salvia scytinophylla Briq.
- Salvia secunda Benth.
- Salvia seemannii Fernald
- Salvia selleana Urb.
- Salvia sellowiana Benth.
- Salvia semiatrata Zucc.
- Salvia semiscaposa Epling ex Fragoso & Mart.Gord.
- Salvia serboana B.L.Turner
- Salvia sericeotomentosa Rech.f.
- Salvia serotina L.
- Salvia serpyllifolia Fernald
- Salvia serranoae J.R.I.Wood
- Salvia sessei Benth.
- Salvia sessilifolia Baker
- Salvia setulosa Fernald
- Salvia shahkuhmahalei Akhani
- Salvia shannonii Donn.Sm.
- Salvia shaofengkouensis S.S.Ying
- Salvia sharifii Rech.f. & Esfand.
- Salvia sharpii Epling & Mathias
- Salvia sigchosica Fern.Alonso
- Salvia siirtica Kahraman, Celep & Dogan
- Salvia sikkimensis E.Peter
- Salvia silvarum Epling
- Salvia similis Brandegee
- Salvia sinaloensis Fernald
- Salvia sinica Migo
- Salvia sirenis J.G.González & Gonz.-Adame
- Salvia siyuanensis S.S.Ying
- Salvia smithii E.Peter
- Salvia smyrnaea Boiss.
- Salvia somalensis Vatke
- Salvia sonchifolia C.Y.Wu
- Salvia sonklarii Pant.
- Salvia sonomensis Greene
- Salvia sophrona Briq.
- Salvia sordida Benth.
- Salvia spathacea Greene
- Salvia speciosa C.Presl ex Benth.
- Salvia speirematoides C.Wright
- Salvia spellenbergii J.G.González
- Salvia sphacelifolia Epling
- Salvia sphacelioides Benth.
- Salvia spinosa L.
- Salvia splendens Sellow ex Nees
- Salvia sprucei Briq.
- Salvia squalens Kunth
- Salvia stachydifolia Benth.
- Salvia stachyoides Kunth
- Salvia staminea Montbret & Aucher ex Benth.
- Salvia stenophylla Burch. ex Benth.
- Salvia stibalii Alziar
- Salvia stolonifera Benth.
- Salvia striata Benth.
- Salvia strobilanthoides C.Wright ex Griseb.
- Salvia strobilifera (Benth.) J.G.González
- Salvia styphelos Epling
- Salvia subaequalis Epling
- Salvia subbipinnata (C.Y.Wu) B.Y.Ding & Z.H.Chen
- Salvia subglabra (Urb.) Urb.
- Salvia subhastata Epling
- Salvia subincisa Benth.
- Salvia submutica Botsch. & Vved.
- Salvia subobscura Epling
- Salvia subpalmatinervis E.Peter
- Salvia subpatens Epling
- Salvia subrotunda A.St.-Hil. ex Benth.
- Salvia subrubens Epling
- Salvia subscandens Epling & Játiva
- Salvia substolonifera E.Peter
- Salvia subviolacea Y.K.Wei & Pendry
- Salvia sucrensis J.R.I.Wood
- Salvia suffruticosa Montbret & Aucher ex Benth.
- Salvia summa A.Nelson
- Salvia synodonta Epling
- Salvia syriaca L.

== T ==
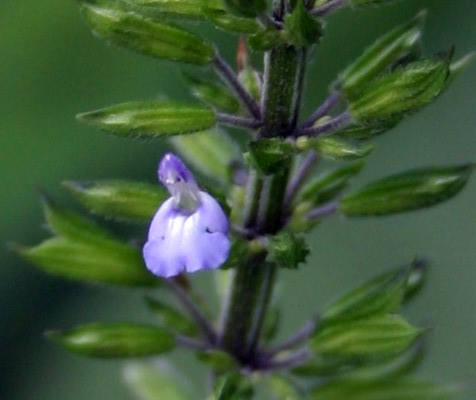
Salvia tiliifolia

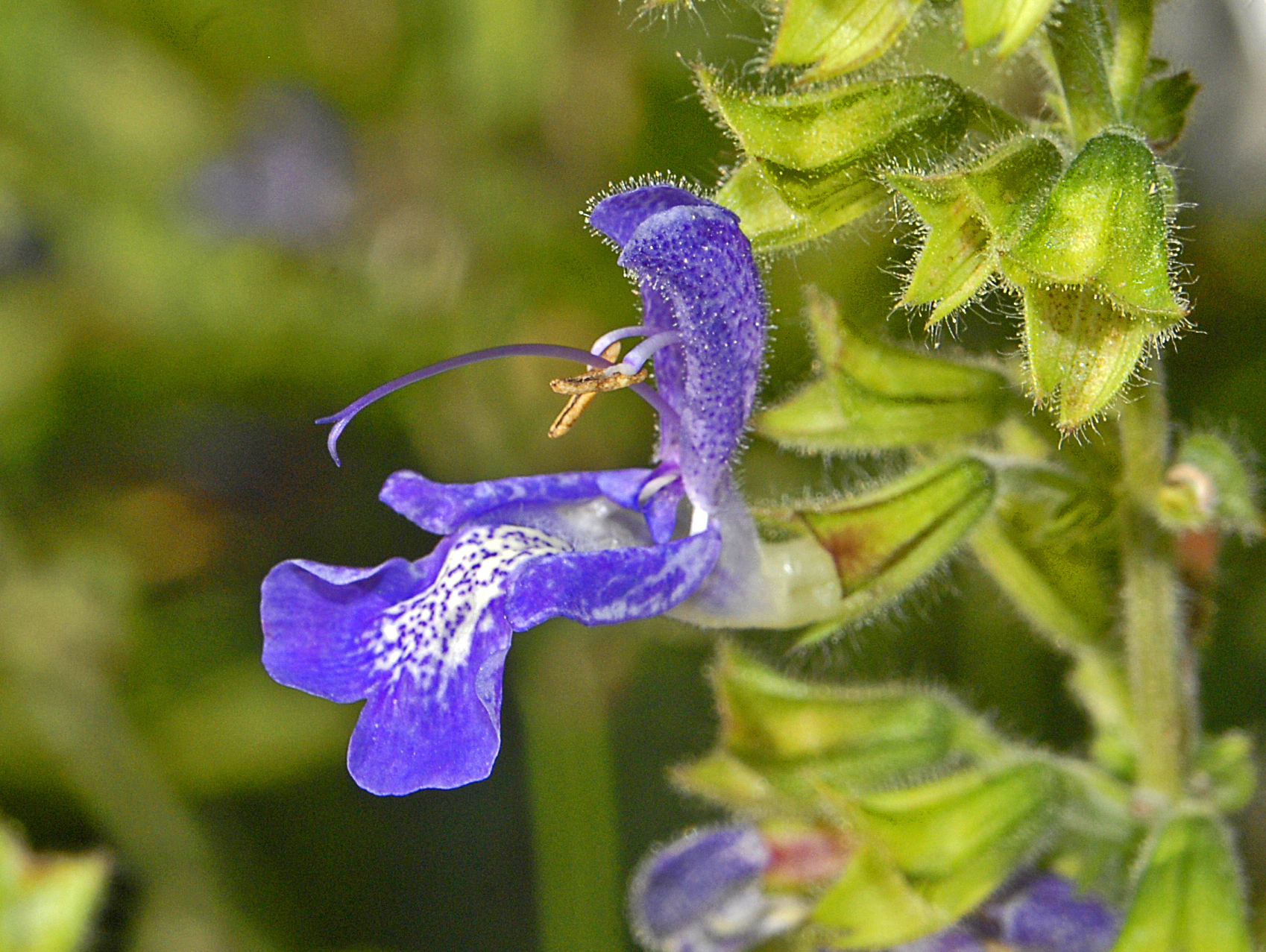
Salvia transsylvanica

- Salvia tafallae Benth.
- Salvia taraxacifolia Coss. & Balansa
- Salvia tchihatcheffii (Fisch. & C.A.Mey.) Boiss.
- Salvia tebesana Bunge
- Salvia teddii Turrill
- Salvia tehuacana Fernald
- Salvia tenella Sw.
- Salvia tenorioi Ramamoorthy ex B.L.Turner
- Salvia tenuiflora Epling
- Salvia tepicensis Fernald
- Salvia teresae Fernald
- Salvia tetramerioides Mart.Gord., Fragoso & García-Peña
- Salvia tetrodonta Hedge
- Salvia texana (Scheele) Torr.
- Salvia textitlana B.L.Turner
- Salvia thermarum van Jaarsv.
- Salvia thomasiana Urb.
- Salvia thormannii Urb.
- Salvia thymoides Benth.
- Salvia thyrsiflora Benth.
- Salvia tianschanica Machm.
- Salvia tigrina Hedge & Hub.-Mor.
- Salvia tilantongensis J.G.González & Aguilar-Sant.
- Salvia tiliifolia Vahl
- Salvia tingitana Etl.
- Salvia toaensis Alain
- Salvia tobeyi Hedge
- Salvia tolimensis Kunth
- Salvia tomentella Pohl
- Salvia tomentosa Mill.
- Salvia tonalensis Brandegee
- Salvia tonaticensis Ramamoorthy ex Lara Cabrera, Bedolla & Zamudio
- Salvia topiensis J.G.González
- Salvia tortuensis Urb.
- Salvia tortuosa Kunth
- Salvia townsendii Fernald
- Salvia trachyphylla Epling
- Salvia transsylvanica (Schur ex Griseb. & Schenk) Schur
- Salvia trautvetteri Regel
- Salvia triangularis Thunb.
- Salvia trichocalycina Benth.
- Salvia trichoclada Benth.
- Salvia trichopes Epling
- Salvia trichostephana Epling
- Salvia tricuspidata M.Martens & Galeotti
- Salvia tricuspis Franch.
- Salvia trifilis Epling
- Salvia trijuga Diels
- Salvia tubifera Cav.
- Salvia tubiflora Sm.
- Salvia tubulosa Epling
- Salvia tuerckheimii Urb.
- Salvia turcomanica Pobed.
- Salvia turdi A.Rich.
- Salvia turneri Ramamoorthy
- Salvia tuxtlensis Ramamoorthy
- Salvia tysonii Skan

== U ==
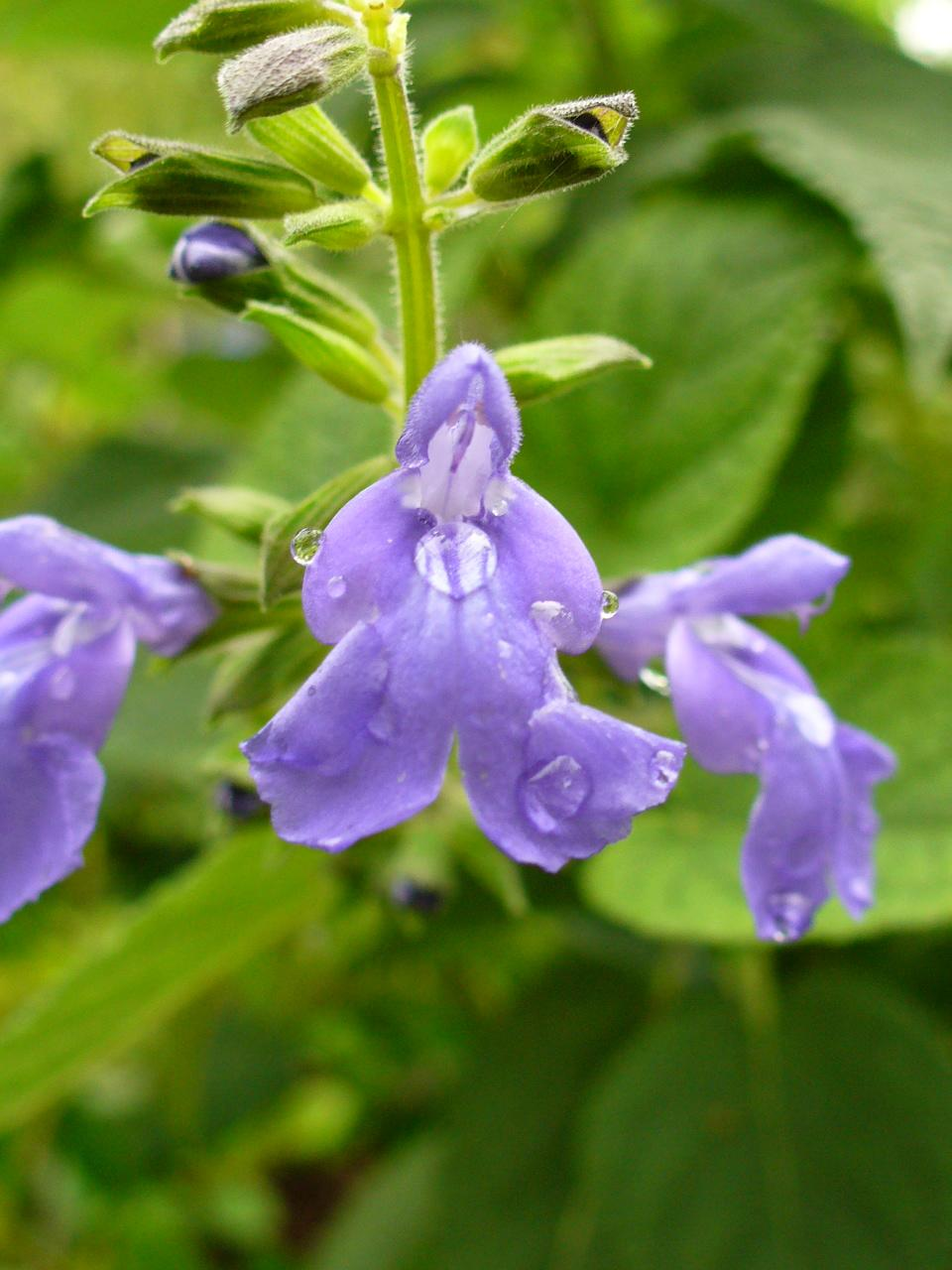
Salvia urica

- Salvia uliginosa Benth.
- Salvia umbratica Hance
- Salvia umbraticola Epling
- Salvia umbratilis Fernald
- Salvia uncinata Urb.
- Salvia unguella Epling
- Salvia unicostata Fernald
- Salvia univerticillata Ramamoorthy ex Klitg.
- Salvia uribei J.R.I.Wood & Harley
- Salvia urica Epling
- Salvia urmiensis Bunge
- Salvia urolepis Fernald
- Salvia urticifolia L.
- Salvia uruapana Fernald

== V ==
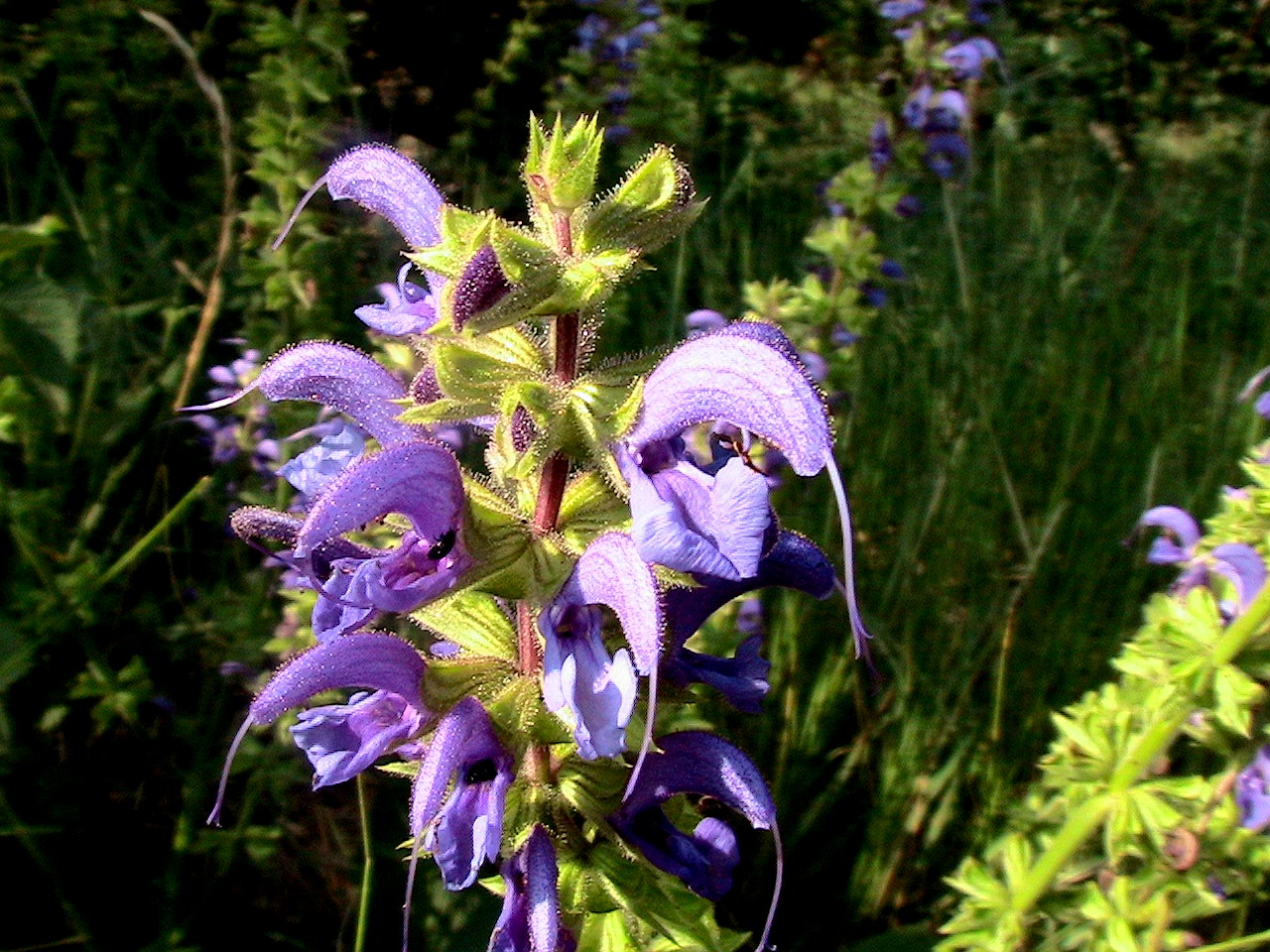
Salvia verbenaca

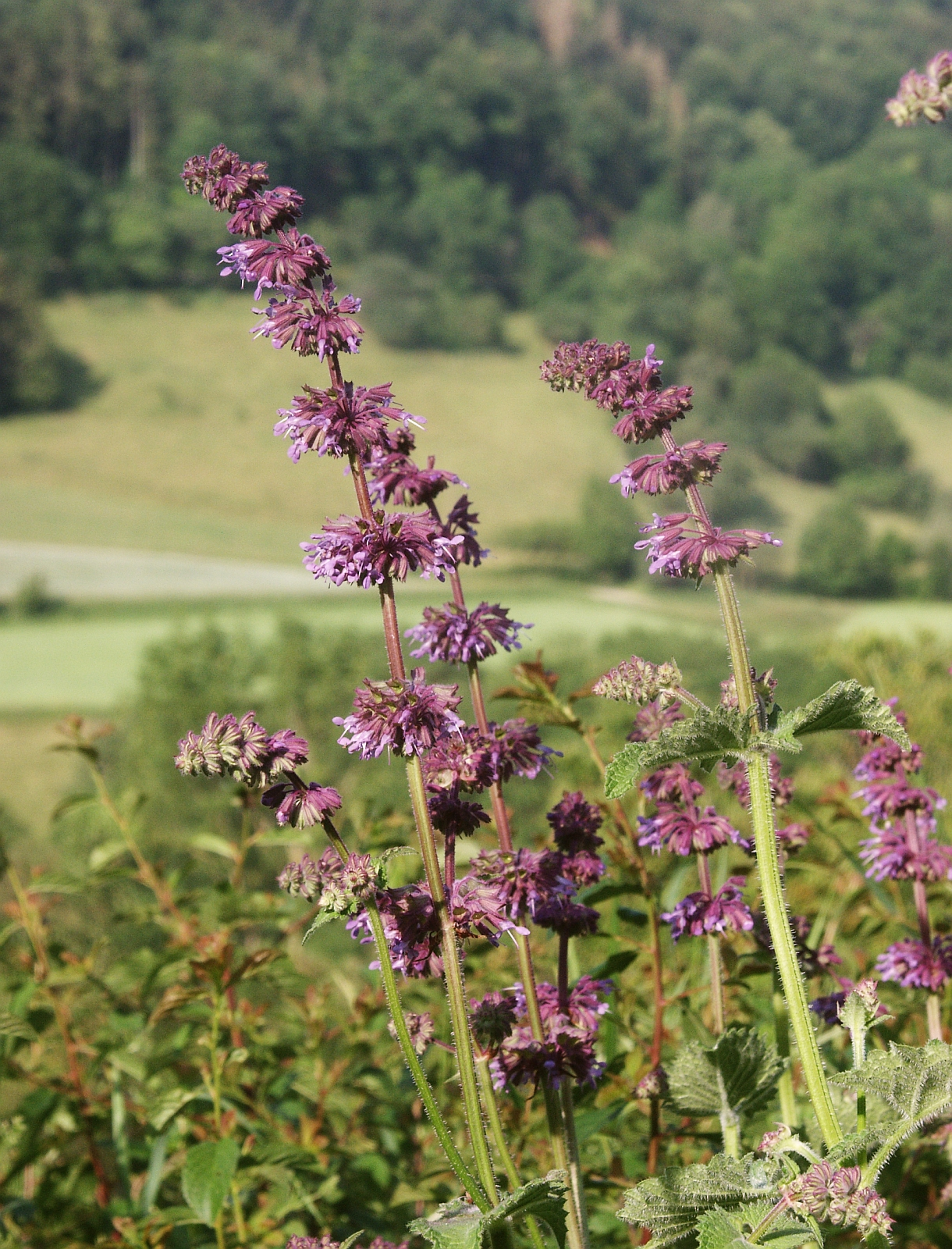
Salvia verticillata

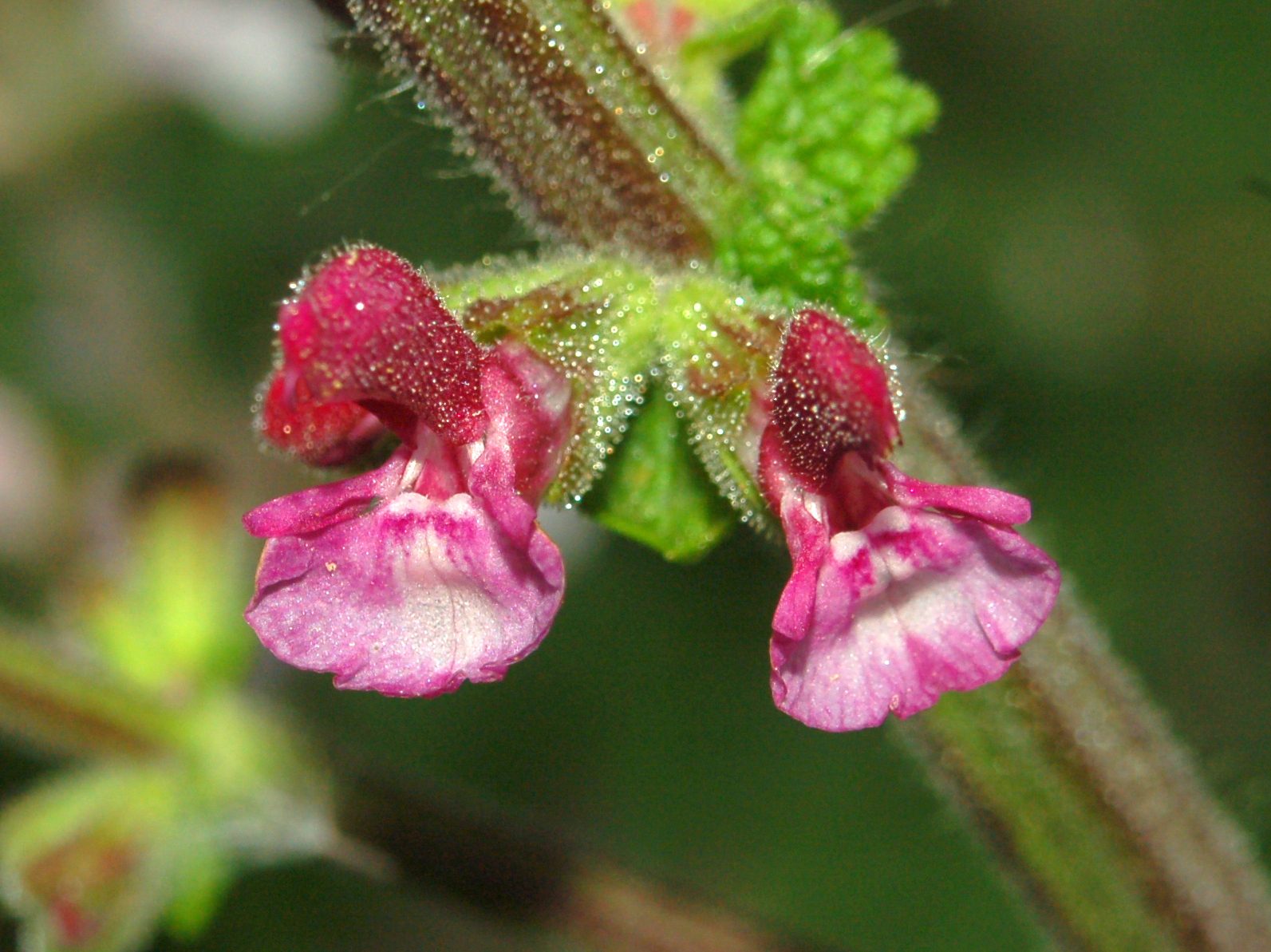
Salvia viscosa

- Salvia valentina Vahl
- Salvia vargas-llosae Sagást. & E.Rodr.
- Salvia vargasii Epling
- Salvia variana Epling
- Salvia vaseyi (Porter) Parish
- Salvia vasta H.W.Li
- Salvia vazquezii Iltis & Ramamoorthy
- Salvia veneris Hedge
- Salvia venturana B.L.Turner
- Salvia venulosa Epling
- Salvia verbascifolia M.Bieb.
- Salvia verbenaca L.
- Salvia verecunda Epling
- Salvia vergeduzica Rzazade
- Salvia vermifolia Hedge & Hub.-Mor.
- Salvia veronicifolia A.Gray
- Salvia verticillata L.
- Salvia vestita Benth.
- Salvia villosa Fernald
- Salvia virgata Jacq.
- Salvia viridis L.
- Salvia viscida A.St.-Hil. ex Benth.
- Salvia viscosa Jacq.
- Salvia vitifolia Benth.
- Salvia vvedenskii Nikitina

== W ==
- Salvia wagneriana Pol.
- Salvia wardii E.Peter
- Salvia warszewicziana Regel
- Salvia weberbaueri Epling
- Salvia wendelboi Hedge
- Salvia whitefoordiae Klitg.
- Salvia whitehousei Alziar
- Salvia wiedemannii Boiss.
- Salvia willeana (Holmboe) Hedge
- Salvia wixarika J.G.González

== X ==
- Salvia xalapensis Benth.
- Salvia xanthocheila Boiss. ex Benth.
- Salvia xanthophylla Epling & Játiva
- Salvia xanthotricha Harley ex E.P.Santos
- Salvia xeropapillosa Fern.Alonso
- Salvia xolocotzii Bedolla & Zamudio

== Y ==
- Salvia yangii B.T.Drew
- Salvia yosgadensis Freyn & Bornm.
- Salvia yukoyukparum Fern.Alonso
- Salvia yunnanensis C.H.Wright

== Z ==
- Salvia zacualpanensis Briq.
- Salvia zamoranensis Zamudio & Bedolla
- Salvia zaragozana B.L.Turner

== Interspecific hybrids ==
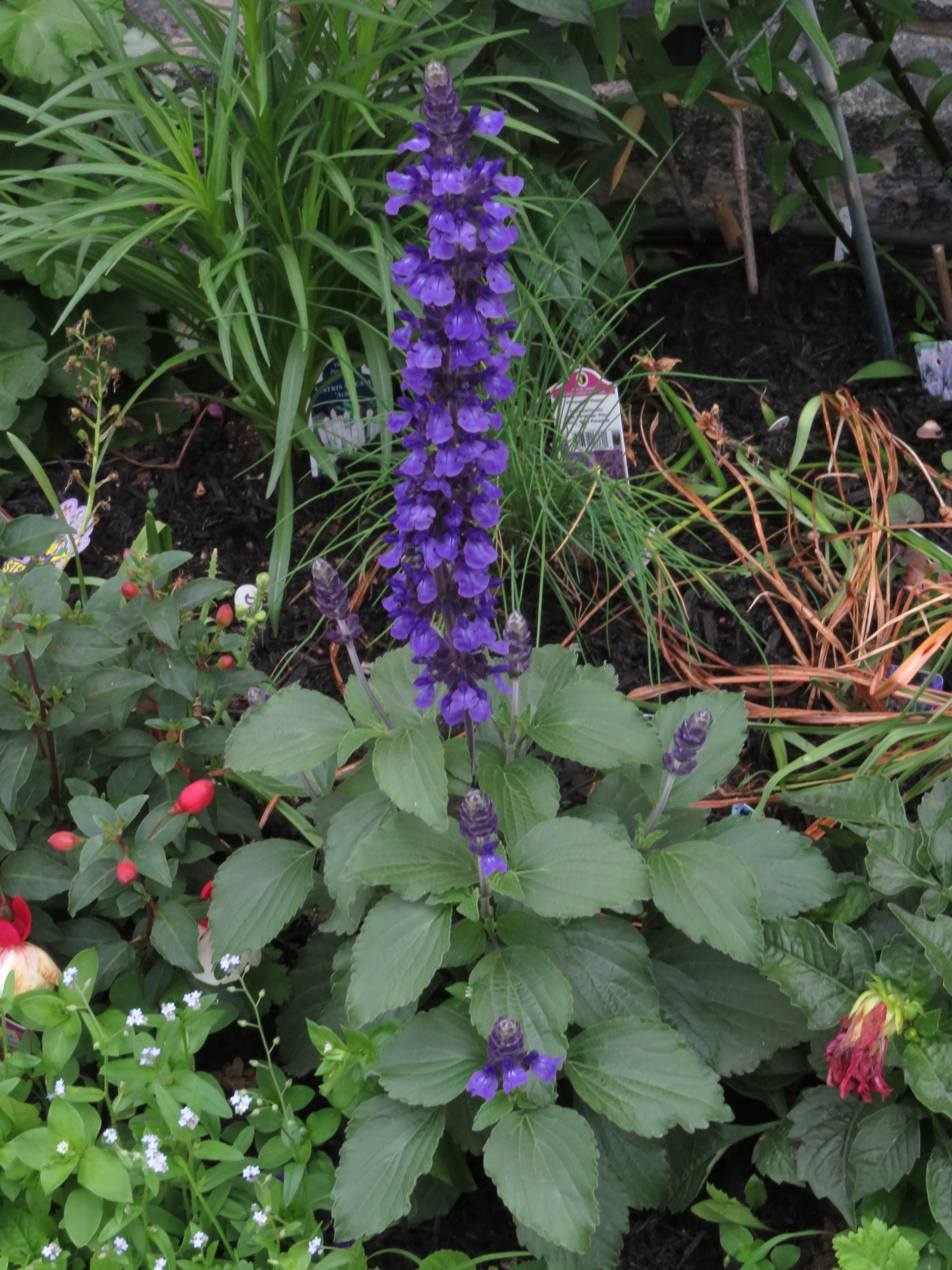
Salvia Mystic Spires Blue 'Balsalmisp'

Hybrids accepted by Plants of the World Online as of May 2024 include:

- Salvia × accidentalis Sánchez-Gómez & R.Morales
- Salvia × adulterina Hausskn.
- Salvia × atroviolacea Fern.Alonso
- Salvia × auriculata Mill.
- Salvia × bernardina Parish ex Greene
- Salvia × bichigeanii Prodan
- Salvia × cadevallii Sennen
- Salvia × cernavodae Nyár.
- Salvia × doganii Celep & B.T.Drew
- Salvia × ferganica Sennikov
- Salvia × hegelmaieri Porta & Rigo
- Salvia × hybrida Schur
- Salvia × jamensis J.Compton
- Salvia × karamanensis Celep & B.T.Drew
- Salvia × kerneri Blocki
- Salvia × lavandulacea (de Noé) Roma-Marzio & Galasso
- Salvia × mendizabalii (Sagredo ex Rosua) Roma-Marzio & Galasso
- Salvia × nariniensis Fern.Alonso
- Salvia × rociana Fern.Alonso
- Salvia × rosuae Figuerola, Stübing & Peris
- Salvia × sakuensis Naruh. & Hihara
- Salvia × simonkaiana Borbás
- Salvia × spiraeifolia Boiss. & Hohen.
- Salvia × sylvestris L.
- Salvia × telekiana Simonk. & Thaisz
- Salvia × tunica-mariae Fern.Alonso
- Salvia × westerae J.R.I.Wood

There are also many horticultural cultivars and hybrids, particularly those involving Salvia microphylla, Salvia greggii and their hybrid Salvia × jamensis.
