= Lepechinia rufocampii =

Conservation status
- Vulnerable (IUCN 3.1)

Scientific classification
- Kingdom: Plantae
- Clade: Tracheophytes
- Clade: Angiosperms
- Clade: Eudicots
- Clade: Asterids
- Order: Lamiales
- Family: Lamiaceae
- Genus: Lepechinia
- Species: L. rufocampii

Binomial name
- Lepechinia rufocampii Epling & Mathias

Species of plant

Lepechinia rufocampii is a species of flowering plant in the family Lamiaceae. It is endemic to central Ecuador, where it occurs in high elevation páramo environments as a prostrate perennial.
