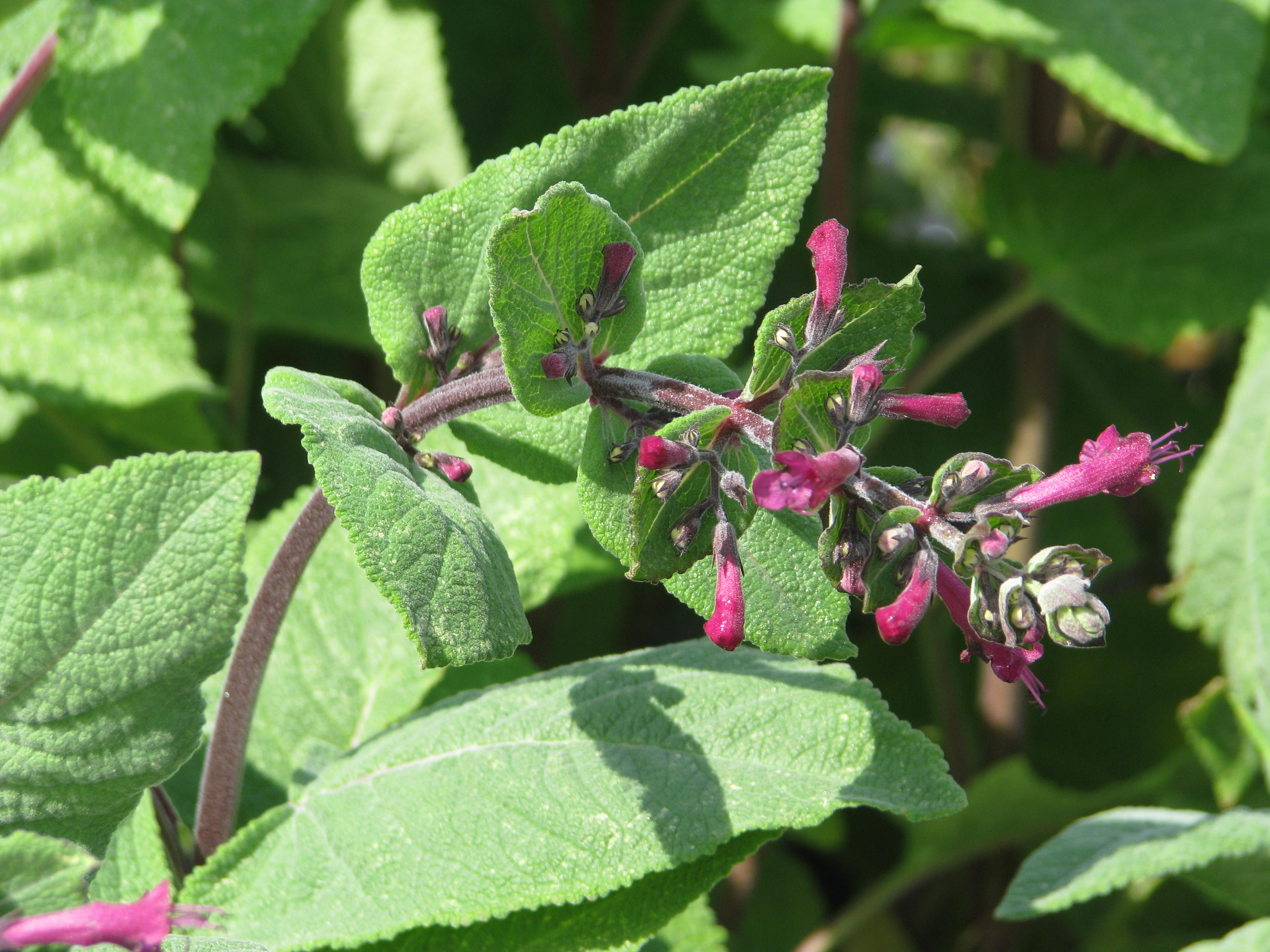

Conservation status
- Vulnerable (NatureServe)

Scientific classification
- Kingdom: Plantae
- Clade: Tracheophytes
- Clade: Angiosperms
- Clade: Eudicots
- Clade: Asterids
- Order: Lamiales
- Family: Lamiaceae
- Genus: Lepechinia
- Species: L. hastata

Binomial name
- Lepechinia hastata (A.Gray) Epling

Synonyms
- Sphacele hastata A.Gray (1862)

= Lepechinia hastata =

Species of flowering plant

Lepechinia hastata is a rare species of perennial shrub in the mint family commonly known as the Cape pitcher sage or Baja pitcher sage. Lepechinia hastata is an aromatic shrub characterized by large, arrowhead-shaped leaves and attractive purple to magenta flowers. In the wild, it is known from the forested mountains of the Sierra de la Laguna in Baja California Sur and the volcanic Socorro Island in the Pacific Ocean, both part of Mexico. The plants of Socorro Island are their own subspecies, and differ in their white flowers and wooly, grayer foliage.

It is also found on the Hawaiian island of Maui where it is known as pakaha. It is unclear if the Hawaiian plants are introduced or represent a natural disjunct population. In horticulture, this plant is a widely-cultivated ornamental. It is one of three species of Lepechinia in the Baja California area, with the other two, Lepechinia ganderi and Lepechinia cardiophylla, found far to the north in drier chaparral habitat.

== Description ==
This species is an aromatic perennial shrub growing 0.3 to 2.3 m (0.98 to 7.55 ft) tall. The stems are 1 to 1.5 cm (0.39 to 0.59 in) thick and closely pubescent. Like in most Lamiaceae, the leaves are arranged opposite, attached to the stem by a petiole around 6.5 cm (2.6 in) long. The upper leaves towards the inflorescence are ovate and sessile. The leaves grow up to 32 cm (13 in) long and 15 cm (5.9 in) wide. The leaves are shaped hastate, with the leaf base cordate to auriculate, the leaf tip acute, and covered in velvety trichomes and raised veins.

The inflorescence is an open panicle, with lateral branches that are 2 to 3 times cymosely branched. The bracts are linear and measure up to 1.1 cm (0.43 in) long. The flowers emerge in axillary, cymose clusters, borne on pedicels that elongate with age and measure about 1.2 cm (0.47 in) at anthesis. The calyx consists of 5 sepals that are fused at the base, the calyx tube 2 to 4 mm (0.079 to 0.157 in) long at anthesis, while the corolla is 4-lobed, 11 to 21 mm (0.43 to 0.83 in) long and colored a purple-magenta.

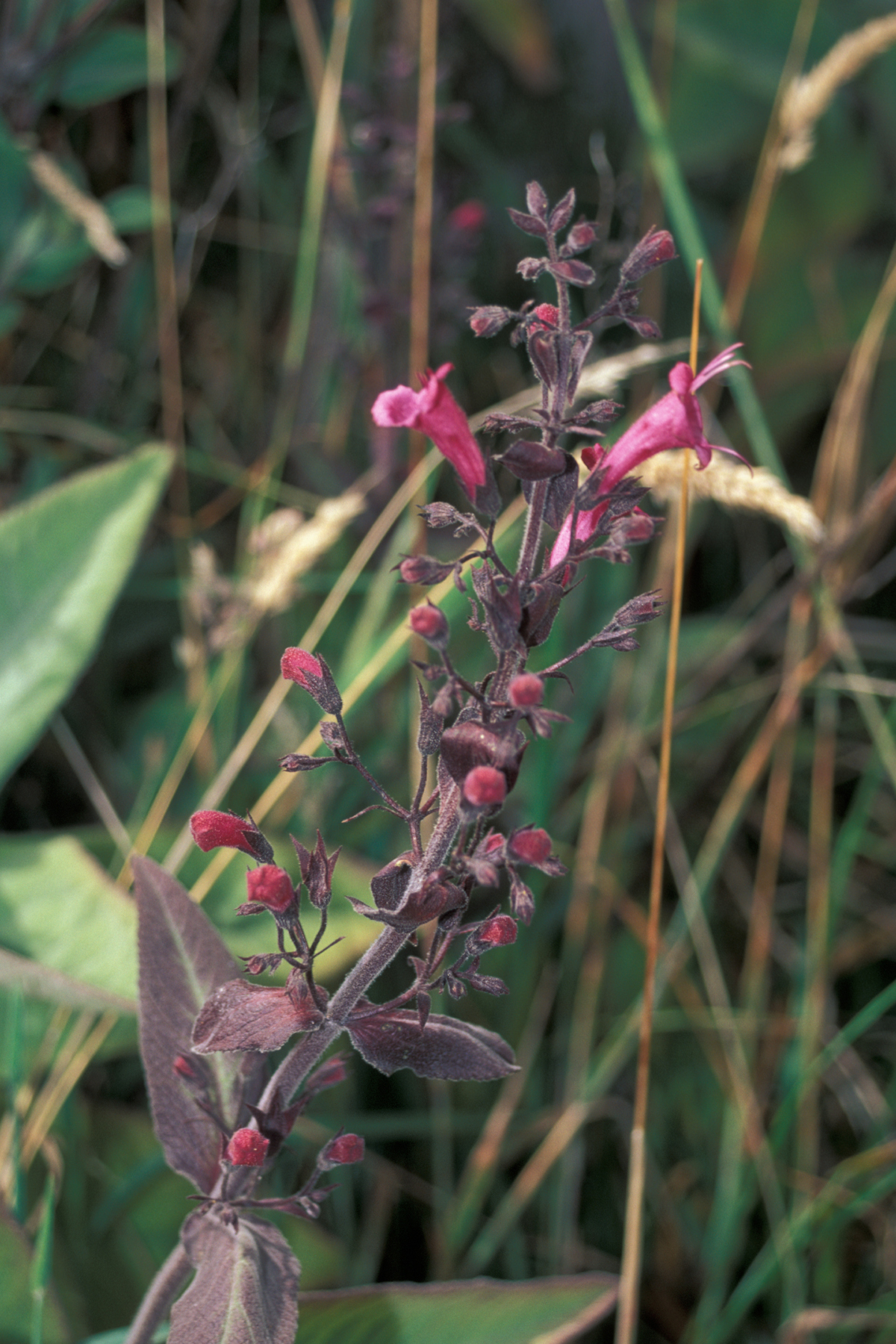
In habitat, Maui

The fruit is divided into 4 nutlets, colored a glossy black, about 5 mm (0.20 in) long and 2.5 mm (0.098 in) wide.

== Taxonomy ==
=== Taxonomic history ===
This species was first described as Sphacele hastata by Asa Gray in 1862, from plants collected by the United States Exploring Expedition led by Charles Wilkes. The type locality is Mouna Haleakala on Maui, at high elevations.

In 1940, botanist Carl Epling, who was the major authority on the Lamiaceae, renamed S. hastata into Lepechinia hastata, and based on collections by Gentry, noted their presence in the oak-pine forests of the Sierra de La Laguna of the Cape region of Baja California Sur.

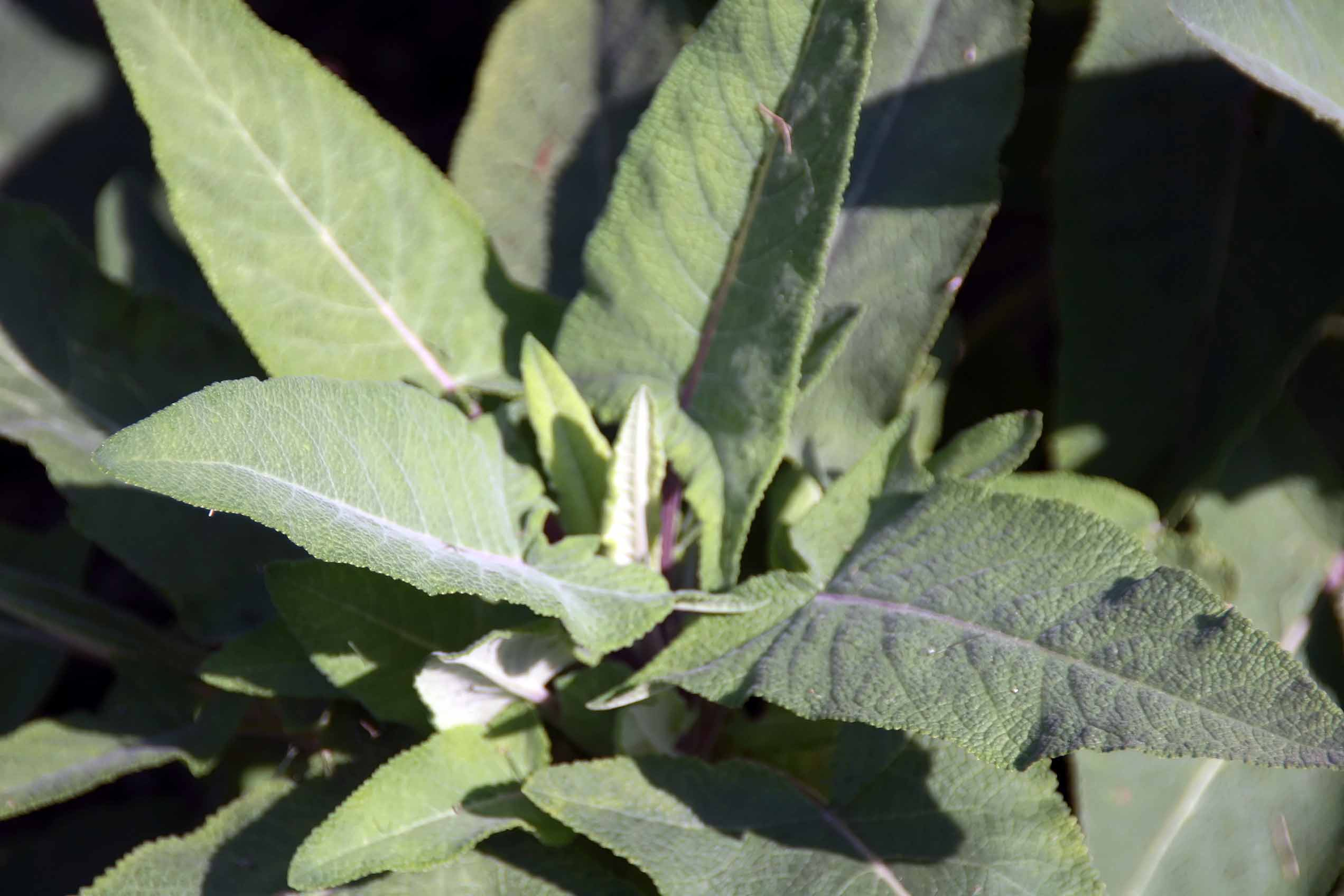
Detail of the leaves

The plants on Socorro Island were discovered by Ivan M. Johnston in 1931 and placed as L. hastata proper, with Lepechinia expert Carl Epling concurring with the identification, but later examination of flowering plants on Socorro in 1989 led to Reid Moran separating the Socorro plants as their own subspecies due to morphological differences.

=== Placement ===
Epling placed L. hastata in the section Thyrsiflorae, which only has one other species, L. nelsonii, from Jalisco and Guerrero, Mexico. The section is distinguished by the open paniculate structure of the inflorescence which is 2 to 3 times cymosely branched. The two species are most similar in their flowers and inflorescences, but differ in their foliage, as L. nelsonii has elliptic or lanceolate leaves that are sessile. Section Thyrsiflorae is most closely allied to the section Speciosae, with L. hastata being most similar in some aspects to that section's L. salviae.

=== Subdivisions ===
- Lepechinia hastata subsp. hastata — The autonymic subspecies. Found in Baja California Sur and the Hawaiian Islands.
- Lepechinia hastata subsp. socorrensis Moran — Endemic to Socorro Island. This species is distinguished by its white-colored flowers, more densely tomentose and conspicuously grayer foliage, and smaller size in terms of its leaves, inflorescence, and floral parts.

== Distribution and habitat ==
=== Mexico ===
In Baja California Sur, subspecies hastata is distributed in the Cape region at the tip of the peninsula, at high elevations in the Sierra de La Laguna. It is found growing in shaded canyons and the Sierra de la Laguna pine–oak forests.

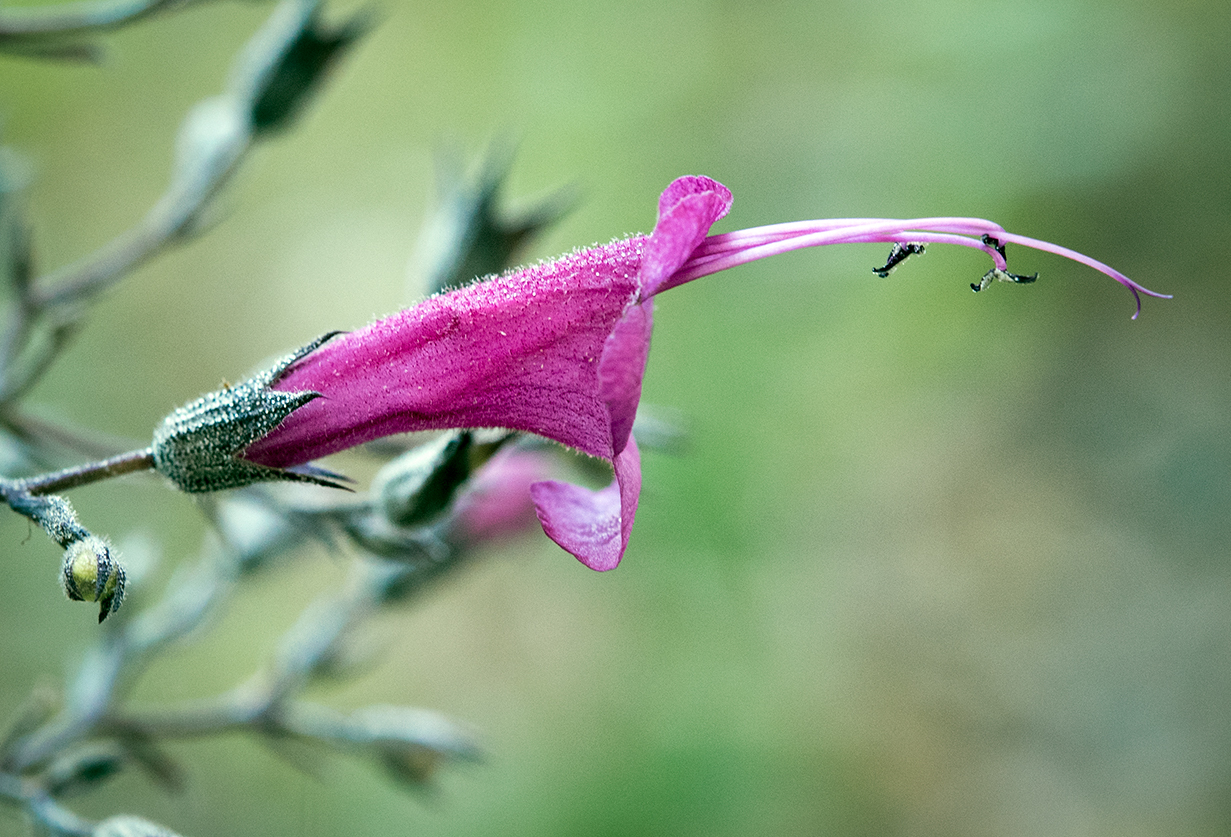
Detail of the flower, in habitat in Baja California Sur

On Socorro Island, subspecies socorrensis is found growing on the upper half of the southern slope of the island, typically in rocky places with low vegetation, where it is often the dominant shrub. The abundance of the plant in spite of the existence of introduced grazing sheep indicates that it may be distasteful to them.

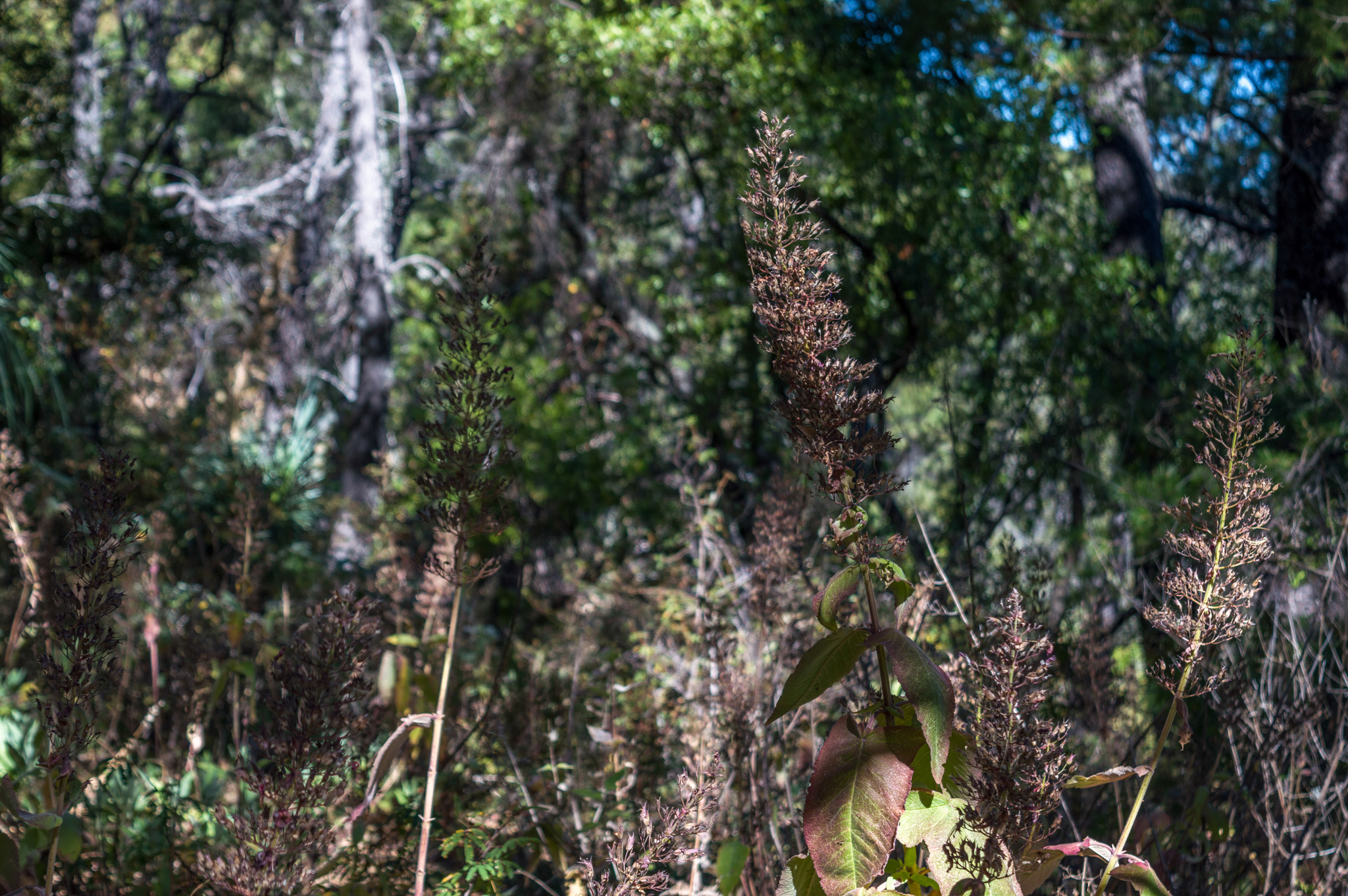
Fruiting in habitat, Baja California Sur

=== Hawaii ===
In the Hawaiian Islands, subspecies hastata is only found on Maui in an "uninterrupted belt" around Haleakala, at an elevation of about 2,000 to 3,000 ft (610 to 910 m) above sea level. Compared with the plants of the Cape region and Socorro Island, the plants of Maui vary in the amount and color of their hairs, with some having a similar amount of pubescence to those on Socorro, and others having less pubescence.

The disjunct distribution between Hawaiian plants and the other plants of subsp. hastata in the Baja California Cape suggests that either this species has been introduced by humans to Hawaii, or that a biogeographic problem must be resolved to explain the distribution. The majority of Lepechinia species are only found in North and South America, and one of the only other outliers, Lepechinia stellata (now a synonym of L. chilensis), was only known from a fragmentary herbarium record from Réunion Island, as the original type specimen was lost. A taxonomic study of the genus conducted in 2011 suggests that the occurrences from Réunion and Hawaii are probably human introductions.

== Uses ==
This species has been used historically as a remedy to treat uterine infections.

This species is cultivated as an ornamental plant, and can survive in poor, dry soils. It is recommended to place it in areas with afternoon shade. In cultivation, it is sometimes erroneously named as Lepechinia salviae, a similar but distinct species from Chile.

== See also ==
- Sweet potato – A species of Ipomoea from the Americas that was dispersed across Polynesia before European exploration.
- Abutilon incanum – A species in the mallow family that grows naturally in southwestern North America, also in Baja California Sur, that is also found disjunctly in the Hawaiian islands.
- Vachellia farnesiana – A species of leguminous tree from Mesoamerica that likely arrived in Australia before European contact, and was recorded in indigenous languages.
