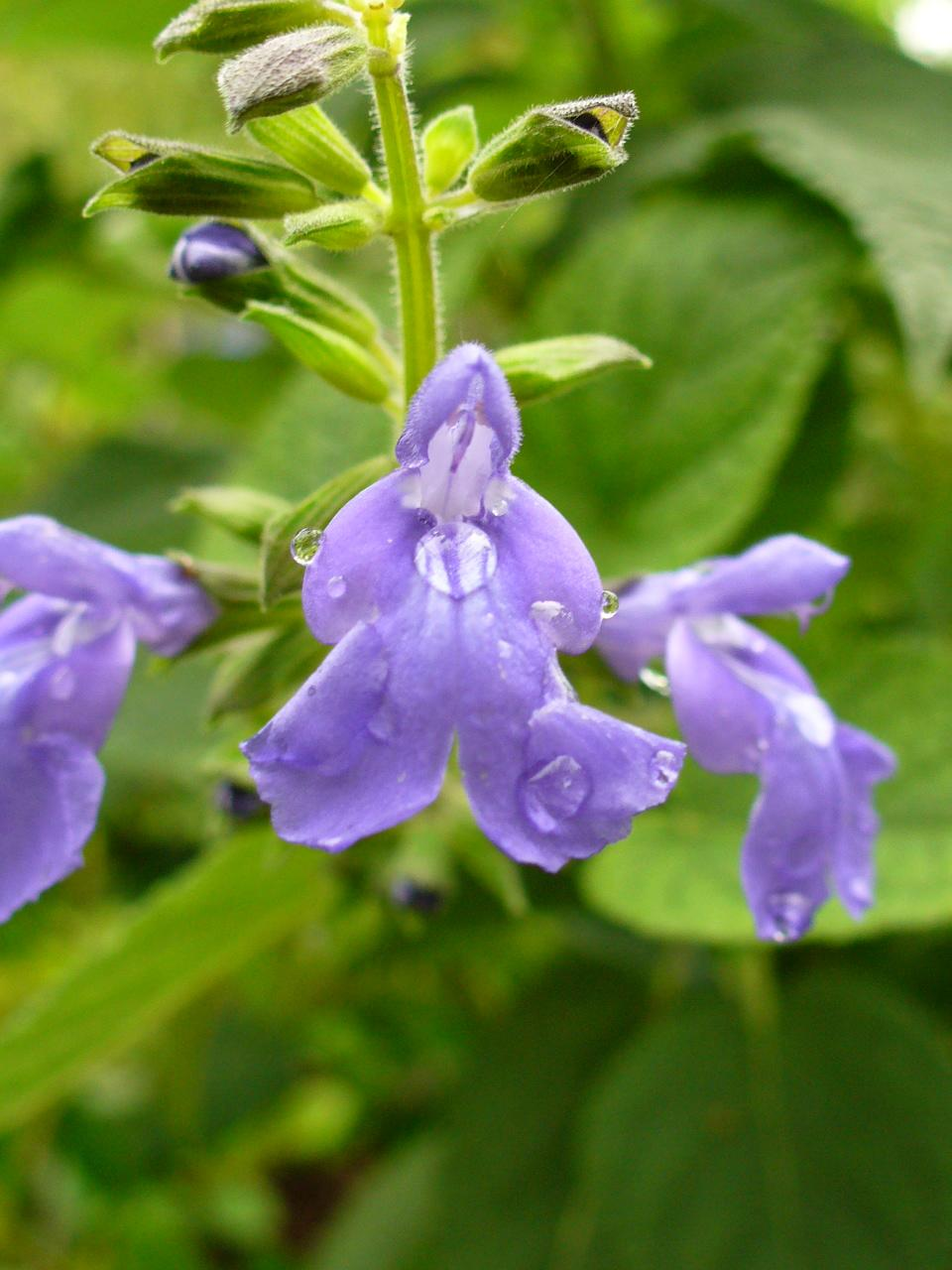

Scientific classification
- Kingdom: Plantae
- Clade: Tracheophytes
- Clade: Angiosperms
- Clade: Eudicots
- Clade: Asterids
- Order: Lamiales
- Family: Lamiaceae
- Genus: Salvia
- Species: S. urica

Binomial name
- Salvia urica Epling

= Salvia urica =

Species of flowering plant

Salvia urica is a herbaceous perennial native to the mountains of Guatemala, Honduras, Belize, and Chiapas, Mexico. It is reportedly most common in Guatemala, where it grows in a wide variety of habitats from 1,000 to 8,000 feet (300 to 2,440 m) elevation, in a mild and moist climate. The specific epithet, urica, means "caterpillar" or "cankerworm", possibly describing the tight whorls of flowers, calyces, and bracts before they open.

Salvia urica grows up to 4 feet (1.2 m) in height and width, with the stems, leaves, and calyces all covered in long white hairs. Glands on the soft-textured leaves give off a slight pleasant aroma when brushed. The leaves are deltoid and 2 to 6 inches (5.1 to 15.2 cm) long, with slightly saw-toothed edges. The rich blue-violet flowers are 0.5 inches (1.3 cm) long, with 3–6 in each whorl, and held by green calyces. The flower's upper lip is narrow with short hairs, while the lower lip is wider with white markings.
