= Salvia peregrina =

Conservation status
- Endangered (IUCN 3.1)

Scientific classification
- Kingdom: Plantae
- Clade: Tracheophytes
- Clade: Angiosperms
- Clade: Eudicots
- Clade: Asterids
- Order: Lamiales
- Family: Lamiaceae
- Genus: Salvia
- Species: S. peregrina

Binomial name
- Salvia peregrina Epling

Species of flowering plant

Salvia peregrina is a species of flowering plant in the family Lamiaceae that is native to Ecuador. Its natural habitat is subtropical or tropical moist mountains.
