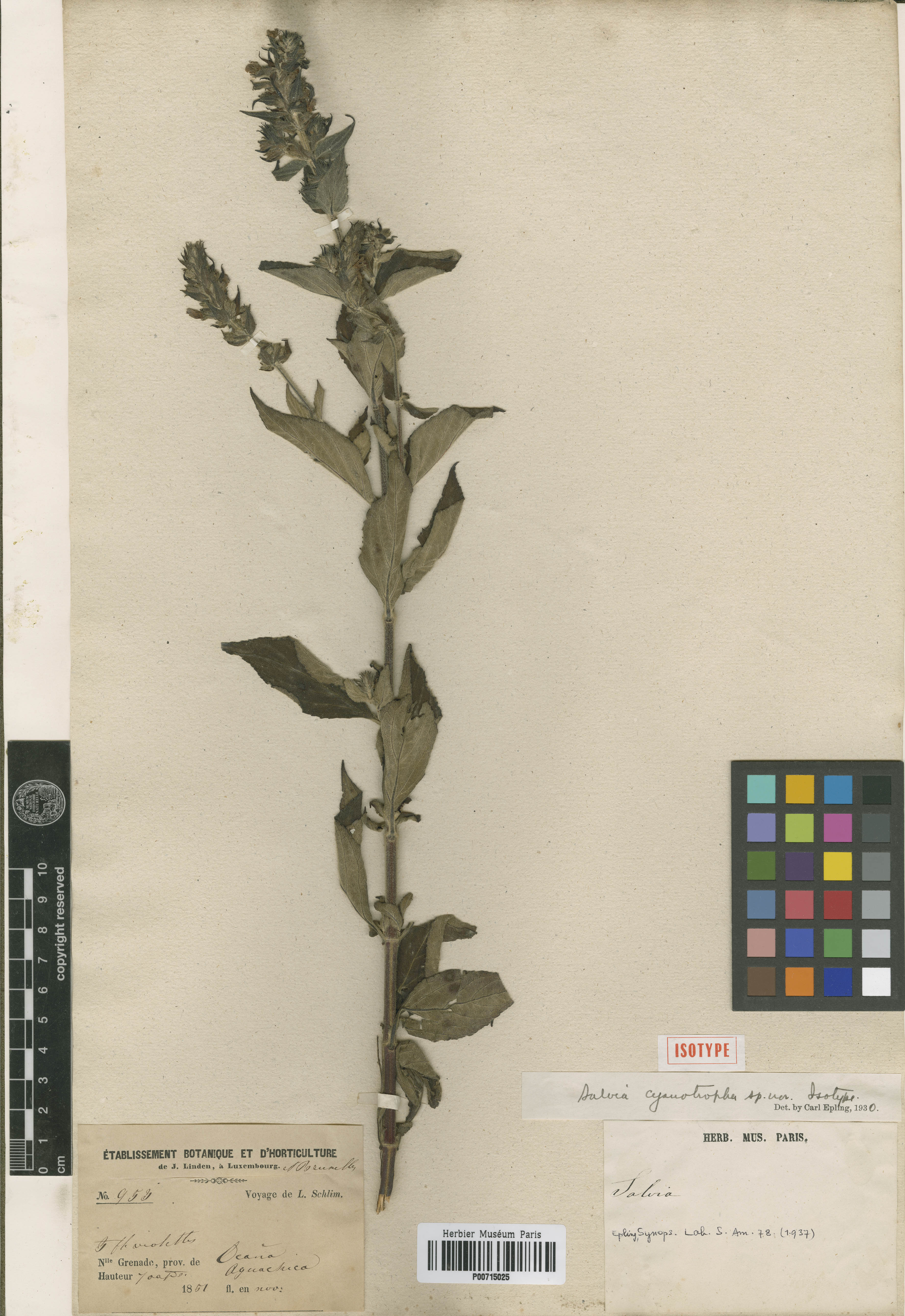

Scientific classification
- Kingdom: Plantae
- Clade: Tracheophytes
- Clade: Angiosperms
- Clade: Eudicots
- Clade: Asterids
- Order: Lamiales
- Family: Lamiaceae
- Genus: Salvia
- Species: S. cyanotropha

Binomial name
- Salvia cyanotropha Epling

= Salvia cyanotropha =

Species of flowering plant

Salvia cyanotropha is a rare and little known perennial Salvia that is endemic to the Ocaña region and the Sierra Nevada de Santa Marta in Colombia. It is found in dryland gullies at 200 to 1,800 m (660 to 5,910 ft) elevation.

S. cayanotropha grows up to 1.5 metres (4.9 ft) high, with shortly petiolate/ovate leaves that are 5 to 7 cm (2.0 to 2.8 in) long and 2 to 2.5 cm (0.79 to 0.98 in) wide. The inflorescence has terminal racemes that are 4 to 10 cm (1.6 to 3.9 in) long, with a blue corolla and a veined upper lip.
