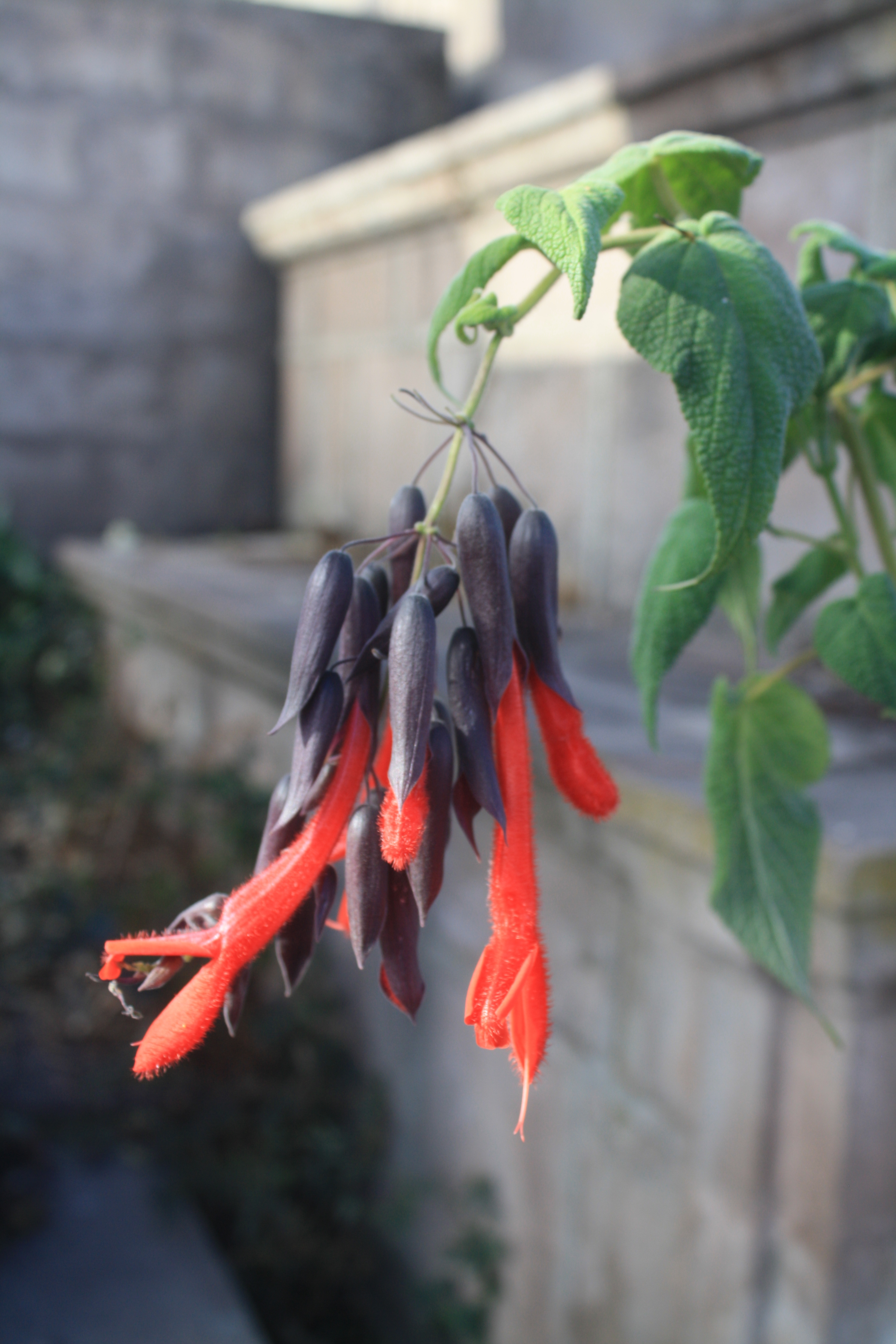

Scientific classification
- Kingdom: Plantae
- Clade: Tracheophytes
- Clade: Angiosperms
- Clade: Eudicots
- Clade: Asterids
- Order: Lamiales
- Family: Lamiaceae
- Genus: Salvia
- Species: S. dombeyi

Binomial name
- Salvia dombeyi Epling

Synonyms
- Salvia longiflora Ruiz & Pavon

= Salvia dombeyi =

Species of plant

Salvia dombeyi, the giant Bolivian sage, is a tender perennial plant found at approximately 3000 m elevation in Peru, and is a popular subject for gardens. In cultivation, and with proper support, this vining sage can climb from 3–6 m. The heart-shaped dark green leaves have a long petiole with short hairs. The flowers are among the largest salvia flowers, typically at least 8 cm long—with a 4 cm currant-red calyx and a 9 cm scarlet corolla.

This semi-evergreen plant has been given an H2 hardiness rating by the Royal Horticultural Society in the UK. It tolerates low temperatures, but not freezing. It prefers a sheltered position in full sun or partial shade.
