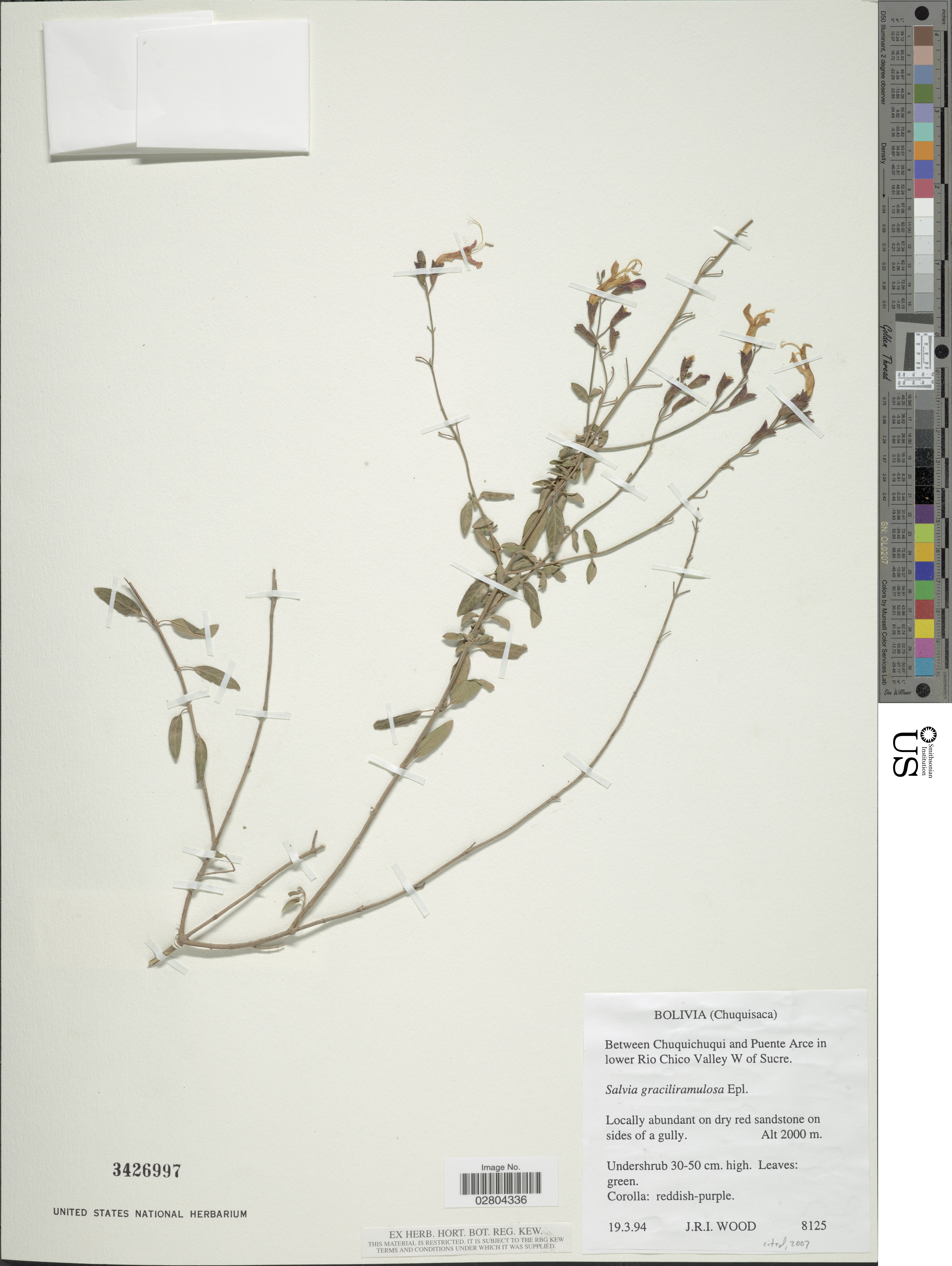

Scientific classification
- Kingdom: Plantae
- Clade: Tracheophytes
- Clade: Angiosperms
- Clade: Eudicots
- Clade: Asterids
- Order: Lamiales
- Family: Lamiaceae
- Genus: Salvia
- Species: S. graciliramulosa

Binomial name
- Salvia graciliramulosa Epling & Játiva

= Salvia graciliramulosa =

Species of shrub

Salvia graciliramulosa is a shrub that is endemic to the Rio Chico valley of Bolivia, growing in red sandstone outcrops at 1,600 to 1,900 m (5,200 to 6,200 ft) elevation, often growing in colonies on bare slopes.

S. graciliramulosa has many branches, reaching 30 to 80 centimetres (0.98 to 2.62 ft) high, with shortly petiolate leaves that are 1 to 2.7 cm (0.39 to 1.06 in) by .3 to .8 cm (0.12 to 0.31 in). The inflorescence of simple terminal spikes grows up to 10 cm (3.9 in) long, with two-flowered verticillasters and a red to reddish-purple corolla that is 1.8 to 2.5 cm (0.71 to 0.98 in) long, held in a deep violet calyx.
