= Salvia trachyphylla =

Conservation status
- Vulnerable (IUCN 3.1)

Scientific classification
- Kingdom: Plantae
- Clade: Tracheophytes
- Clade: Angiosperms
- Clade: Eudicots
- Clade: Asterids
- Order: Lamiales
- Family: Lamiaceae
- Genus: Salvia
- Species: S. trachyphylla

Binomial name
- Salvia trachyphylla Epling

Species of flowering plant

Salvia trachyphylla is a species of flowering plant in the family Lamiaceae that is native to Ecuador. Its natural habitats are subtropical or tropical moist montane forests and subtropical or tropical high-altitude shrubland.
