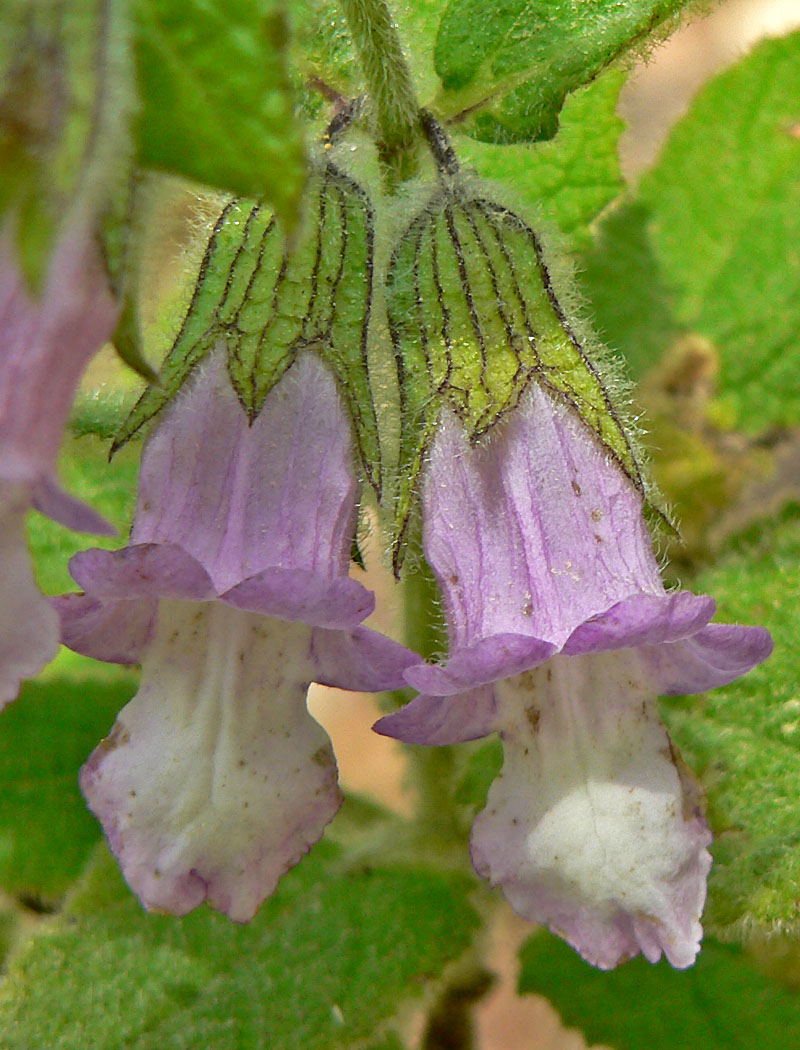

Scientific classification
- Kingdom: Plantae
- Clade: Tracheophytes
- Clade: Angiosperms
- Clade: Eudicots
- Clade: Asterids
- Order: Lamiales
- Family: Lamiaceae
- Genus: Lepechinia
- Species: L. fragrans

Binomial name
- Lepechinia fragrans (Greene) Epling

= Lepechinia fragrans =

Species of shrub

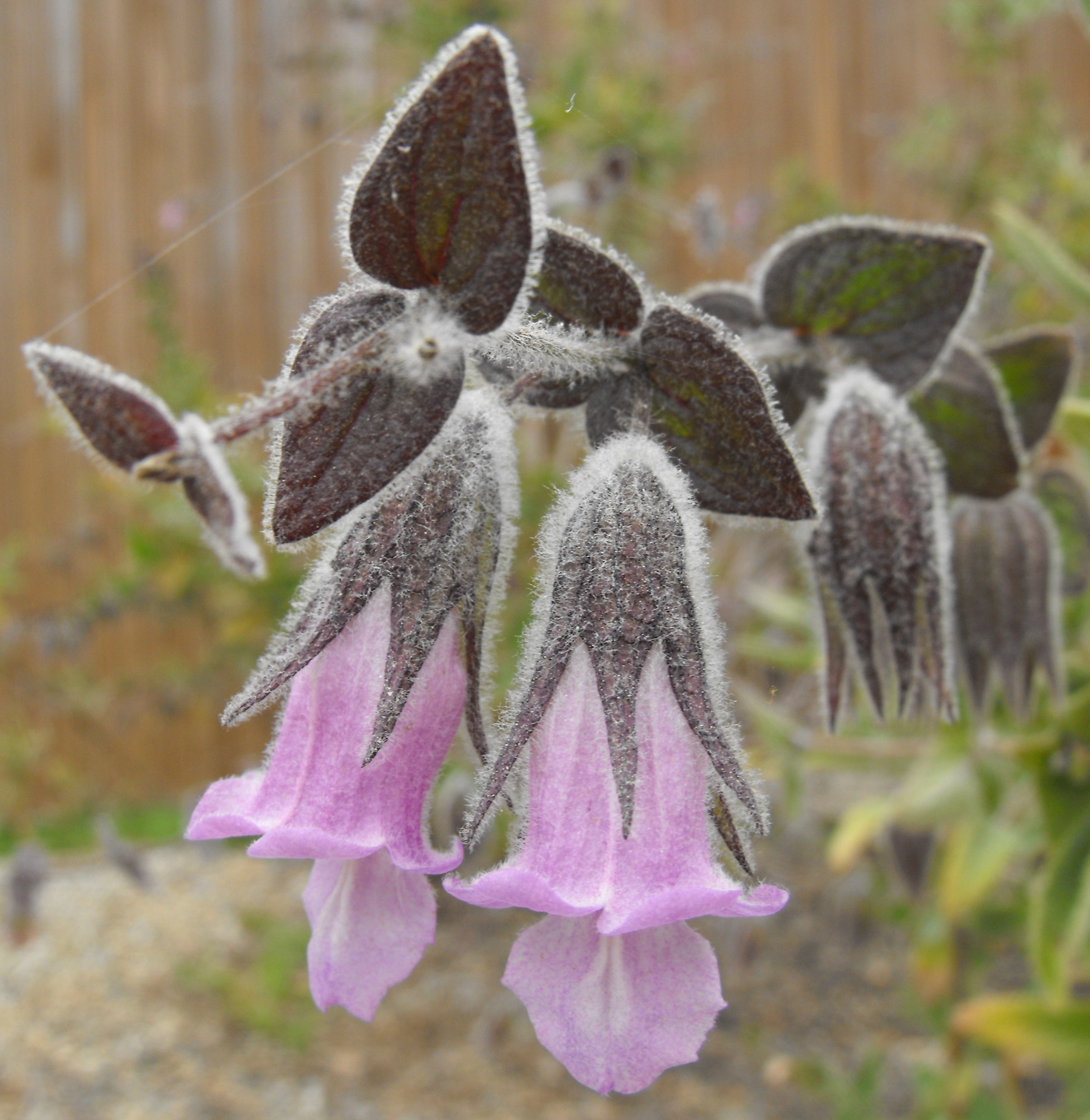
The cultivar 'El Tigre'

Lepechinia fragrans is a flowering herbaceous shrub known by the common names island pitchersage and fragrant pitchersage. It is a member of the Lamiaceae, or mint family, but like other Lepechinia, the flowers are borne in racemes instead of in mintlike whorls.

== Distribution ==
Lepechinia fragrans is endemic to California. It is found in open areas in chaparral, in dry ravines, on rocky slopes and ridgetops, between 60 and 1100 meters. It is known in the Trifuno Pass area of the Santa Monica Mountains and in the San Gabriel Mountains, as well as the north Channel Islands. It may also exist in Ventura County and areas on the south coast below Los Angeles County, California.

It is threatened by development and by fire management. While it is not listed as a threatened or endangered plant by the State of California or by the U.S. federal government, it is listed by the California Native Plant Society as a plant of limited distribution which is fairly endangered and should be watched.

== Description ==
Lepechinia fragrans is a vase-shaped herbaceous shrub from 60 centimeters to just under 2 meters in height and equal in spread. It tends to grow taller in shade, and somewhat shorter in full sun. The plant itself is light green, but the many hairs give it a fuzzy grayish-green appearance. The entire plant is hairy, with long nonglandular hairs and glands which have short or no stalks. It has a pleasant scent which may be released when the glands are touched. Its arching branches become woody toward the base of the plant. It has the square stems of the mint family, which are very pronounced in this species.

The leaves can be deltate-lanceolate or ovate-lanceolate, and are smooth-edged or slightly serrate. The lower ones are petioled below and generally larger, to 12 centimeters. Upper leaves can lack petioles and are generally smaller, as little as 4 centimeters in length. Like many of California's plants, it has two types of leaves. Larger, lusher leaves are produced during the rainy season in winter, and some of these are shed during the dry season, and are replaced by leaves which are smaller and more gray in color

The flowers range in color from white to pale pink to medium purple. The calyx has 5 lobes and is slightly two-lipped. It is persistent in fruit and enlarges, becoming slightly inflated and turning purple. The corolla is bell-shaped and 2.5 to 3 centimeters long. It is also two-lipped, with the upper lip divided into 4 lobes, and a larger, unlobed lower lip. There are two pairs of stamens and a double-lobed style in the flower's throat.

The fruit is a cluster of four smooth to shiny nutlets which are dark brown to black in color. They are round to ovate, with a length of 2 to 4 millimeters.

== Cultivation ==
The Lepechinia fragrans plant is easy to grow, and is easy to propagate from seed, but can be a short-lived ornamental plant in the garden. Lepechinia fragrans "has the most attractive flowers and most pleasing scent of all our native pitcher sage species" according to California Native Plants for the Garden. It is pollinated by bumblebees.

It will grow in sun or light shade, and does best in soils with good drainage. It should be pinched back to create a more compact, fuller plant.

The cultivar 'El Tigre' has darker blooms and more purple in the calyx and bracts.
