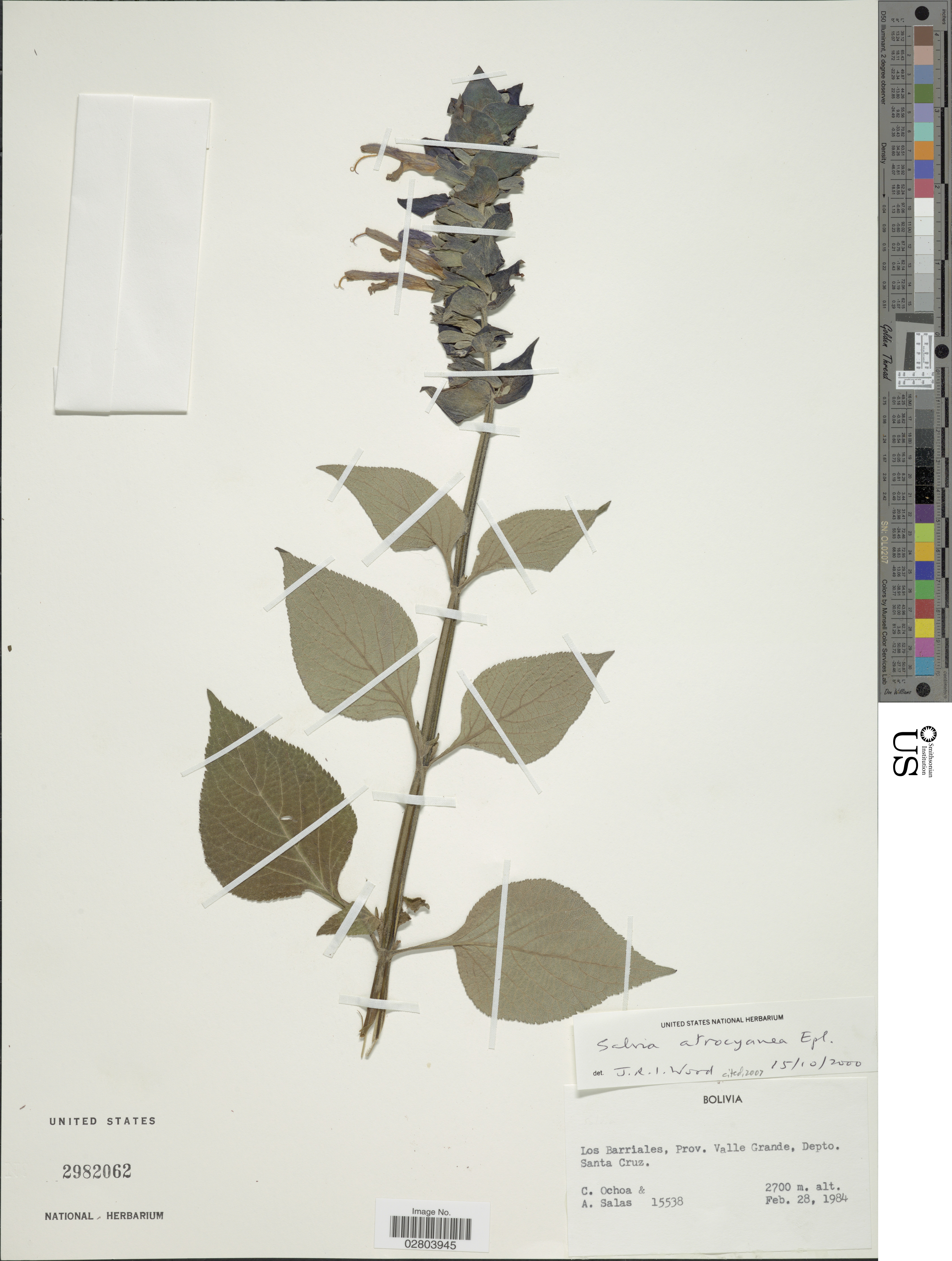

Scientific classification
- Kingdom: Plantae
- Clade: Tracheophytes
- Clade: Angiosperms
- Clade: Eudicots
- Clade: Asterids
- Order: Lamiales
- Family: Lamiaceae
- Genus: Salvia
- Species: S. atrocyanea

Binomial name
- Salvia atrocyanea Epling

= Salvia atrocyanea =

Species of flowering plant

Salvia atrocyanea is a herbaceous perennial plant that is native to Bolivia. It grows to 1.75 m (5.7 ft) tall, with bright blue flowers that are tightly packed on drooping inflorescences as long as 50 cm (20 in). It has large green calyces and blue-tinged bracts.
