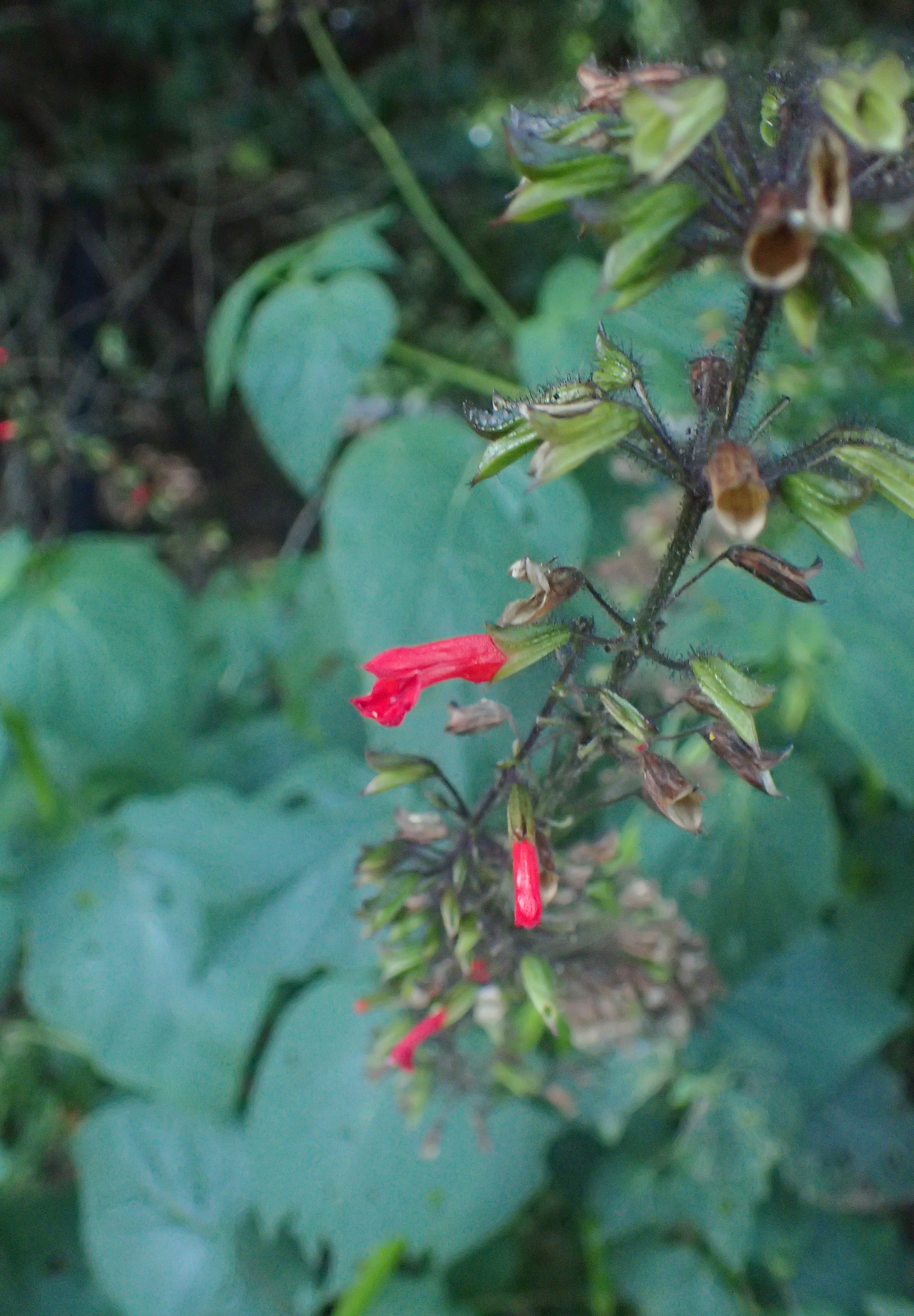

Scientific classification
- Kingdom: Plantae
- Clade: Tracheophytes
- Clade: Angiosperms
- Clade: Eudicots
- Clade: Asterids
- Order: Lamiales
- Family: Lamiaceae
- Genus: Salvia
- Species: S. orthostachys

Binomial name
- Salvia orthostachys Epling

= Salvia orthostachys =

Species of shrub

Salvia orthostachys is a perennial shrub endemic to Colombia, growing in dry country on roadsides, rocky banks, and stony bushland. The plant reaches up to 1.5 m (4.9 ft) high, with leaves that are hairy on both surfaces. The red flower is up to 2 cm (0.79 in) long, with a short upper lip.
