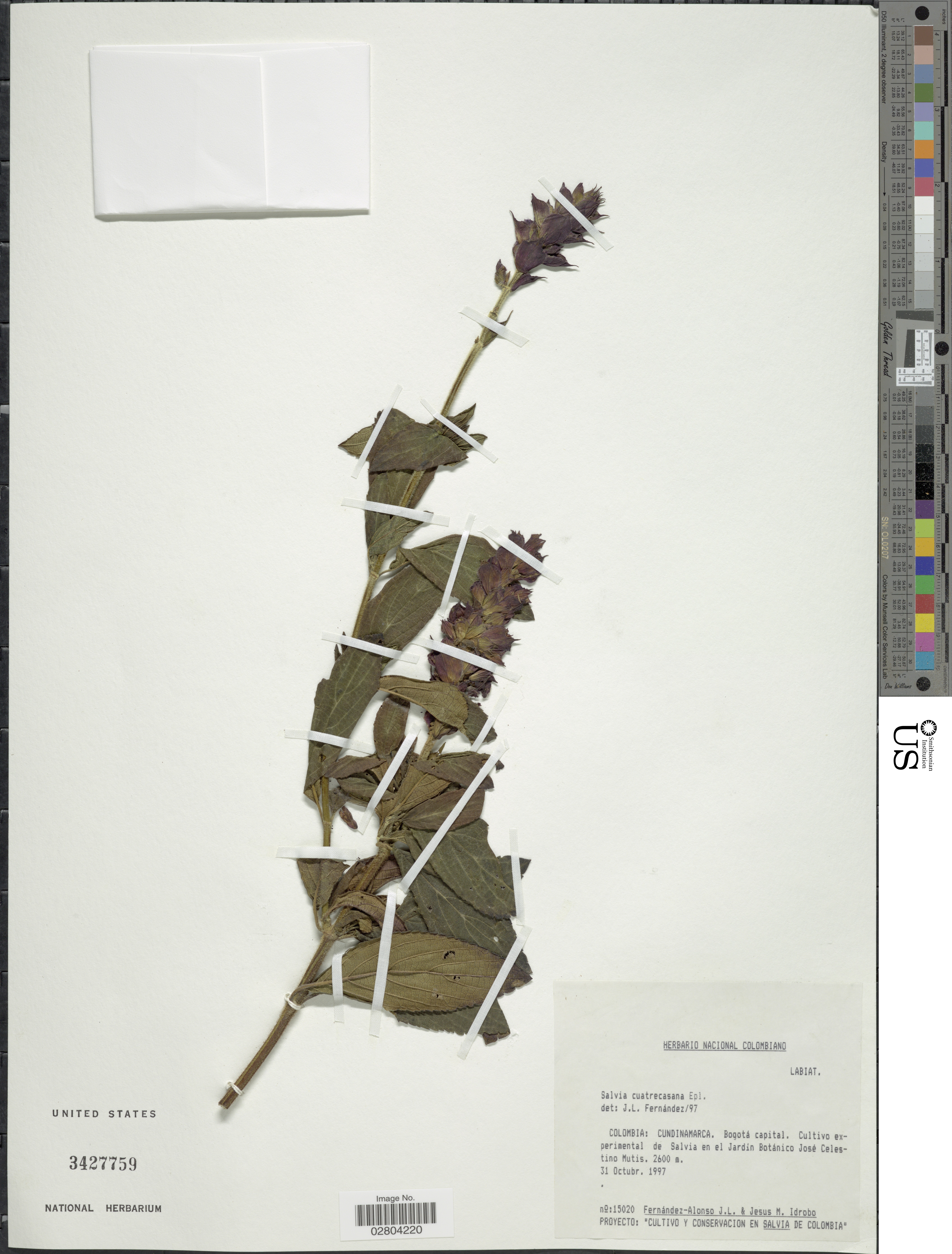

Scientific classification
- Kingdom: Plantae
- Clade: Tracheophytes
- Clade: Angiosperms
- Clade: Eudicots
- Clade: Asterids
- Order: Lamiales
- Family: Lamiaceae
- Genus: Salvia
- Species: S. cuatrecasasiana

Binomial name
- Salvia cuatrecasasiana Epling

Synonyms
- Salvia cuatrecasana Epling, orth. var.

= Salvia cuatrecasasiana =

Species of shrub

Salvia cuatrecasasiana, first described as Salvia cuatrecasana, is a perennial shrub that is endemic to a few small areas in Colombia, growing at 2,800 to 3,500 m (9,200 to 11,500 ft) elevation on roadsides, streamsides, and disturbed areas.

== Description ==
S. cuatrecasasiana grows to 1 to 1.5 m (3.3 to 4.9 ft) high, with narrow ovate or elliptic leaves that are 3 to 6 cm (1.2 to 2.4 in) long and 1 to 3 cm (0.39 to 1.18 in) wide. The upper leaf is green with sparse hairs and distinctive veins. The inflorescence has short, dense, terminal racemes with a 15 mm (0.59 in) purple corolla held in a dark purple and strongly veined calyx. The dense, short racemes, purple flowers, and the prominent veins on leaf and calyx make the plant easily recognizable.

== Taxonomy ==
The species was first described by Carl Epling in 1944. It was named in honour of José Cuatrecasas, who had collected the type specimen in 1940. Epling spelt the specific epithet cuatrecasana. Article 60 of the International Code of Nomenclature for algae, fungi, and plants (in particular Article 60.8 of the 2017 Shenzhen Code) specifies how epithets should be formed from personal names, and requires those not formed in accordance with the Code to be corrected. The International Plant Names Index, Plants of the World Online, and Tropicos have all corrected the spelling to cuatrecasasiana, although other sources continue to use the original spelling.
