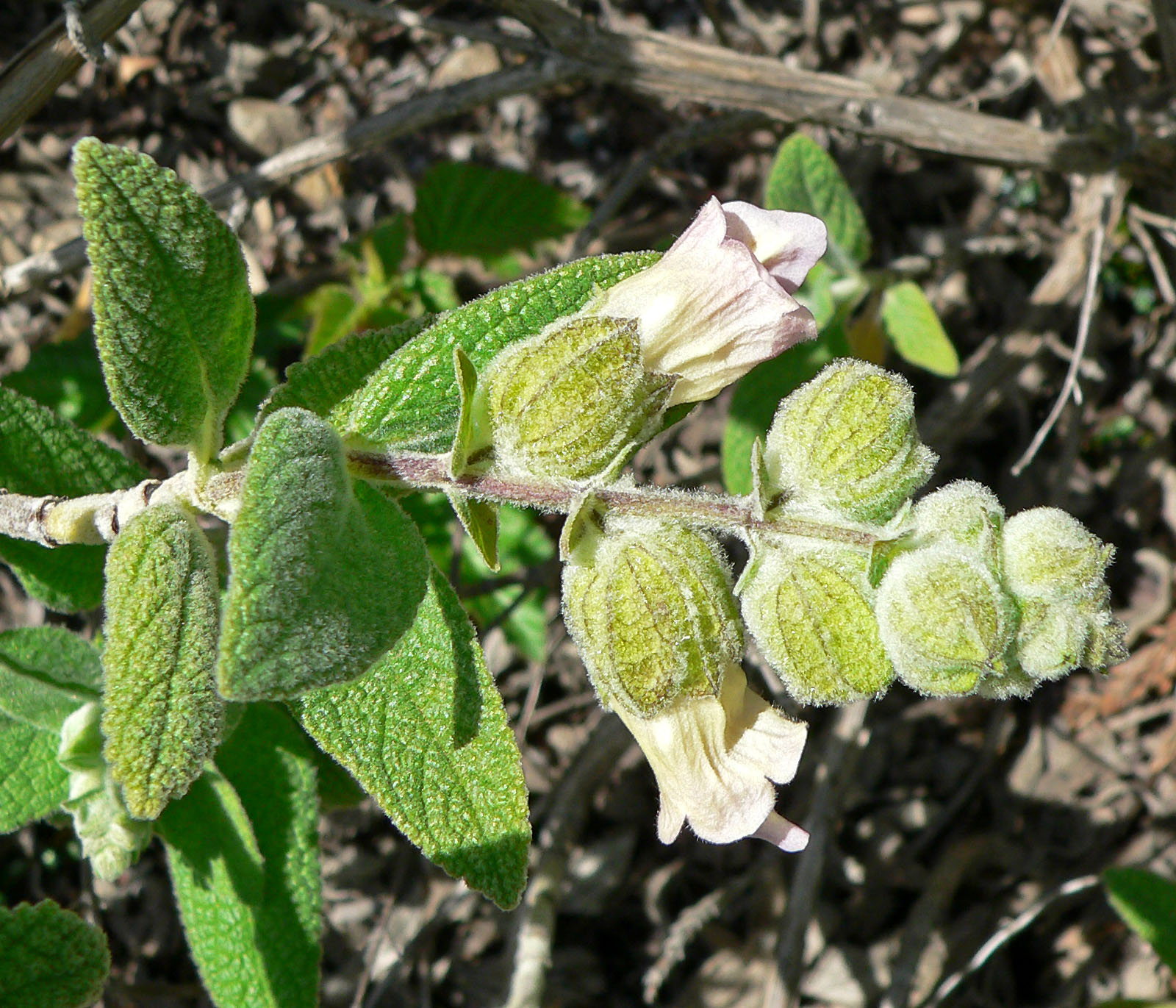

Scientific classification
- Kingdom: Plantae
- Clade: Tracheophytes
- Clade: Angiosperms
- Clade: Eudicots
- Clade: Asterids
- Order: Lamiales
- Family: Lamiaceae
- Genus: Lepechinia
- Species: L. calycina

Binomial name
- Lepechinia calycina (Benth.) Epling ex Munz

= Lepechinia calycina =

Species of plant

Lepechinia calycina is a species of flowering plant in the mint family known by the common name pitchersage or woodbalm. It is endemic to California, where it is a common plant in several different habitat types, including the chaparral plant community.

== Description ==
Lepechinia calycina is an aromatic shrub with parts of its bark covered in long hairs, some of which have resin glands in them. The leaves are lance-shaped to roughly oval and are sometimes toothed along the edges.

The shrub flowers in loose raceme inflorescences. Each flower is encased in a cuplike calyx of sepals which are green when new and age to reddish purple. The somewhat cylindrical corolla of the flower is white to light lavender and is rolled back at the tip into four small lips and one longer lip. The tiny fruit develops within the sepal cup after the flower falls. The fruit is rounded, dark in color, and slightly hairy.

== Uses ==
The Miwok, a Native American group of California, used an extract of the leaves of this plant to treat fever and headache.
