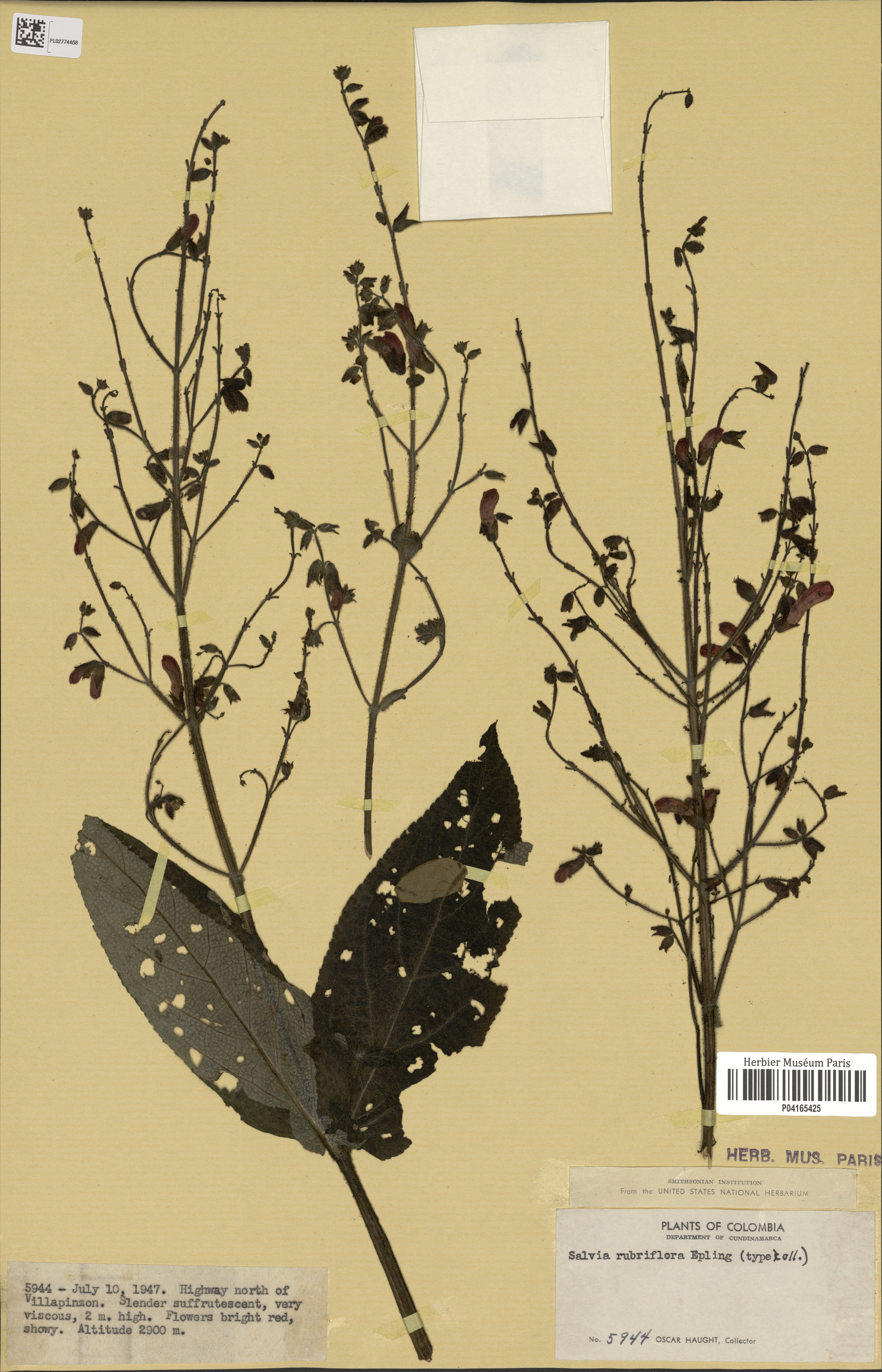

Scientific classification
- Kingdom: Plantae
- Clade: Tracheophytes
- Clade: Angiosperms
- Clade: Eudicots
- Clade: Asterids
- Order: Lamiales
- Family: Lamiaceae
- Genus: Salvia
- Species: S. rubriflora

Binomial name
- Salvia rubriflora Epling

= Salvia rubriflora =

Species of shrub

Salvia rubriflora is a perennial clump forming undershrub endemic to Colombia, growing on exposed grassy banks, near streams, and in dry bushland at elevations from 2,600 to 3,000 m (8,500 to 9,800 ft). It is an uncommon plant, most often found at the Cundinamarca-Boyaca border.

It is described as one of the more distinctive Colombian salvias, growing 1 to 2 m (3.3 to 6.6 ft) tall with erect stems and triangular-hastate leaves that are 12 to 20 cm (4.7 to 7.9 in) long and 6 to 9 cm (2.4 to 3.5 in) wide. The red flower is 2.5 to 3 cm (0.98 to 1.18 in) long.
