= Salvia cyanocephala =

Scientific classification
- Kingdom: Plantae
- Clade: Tracheophytes
- Clade: Angiosperms
- Clade: Eudicots
- Clade: Asterids
- Order: Lamiales
- Family: Lamiaceae
- Genus: Salvia
- Species: S. cyanocephala

Binomial name
- Salvia cyanocephala Epling

Species of flowering plant

Salvia cyanocephala is an uncommon perennial that is endemic to Colombia, typically found near streams in bushy areas at 2,300 to 2,800 m (7,500 to 9,200 ft) elevation.

It grows up to 1 metre (3.3 ft) high, with ovate cordate leaves, and a blue flower from 3.5 to 4.5 cm (1.4 to 1.8 in) long with an unusual 'gaping calyx'.
