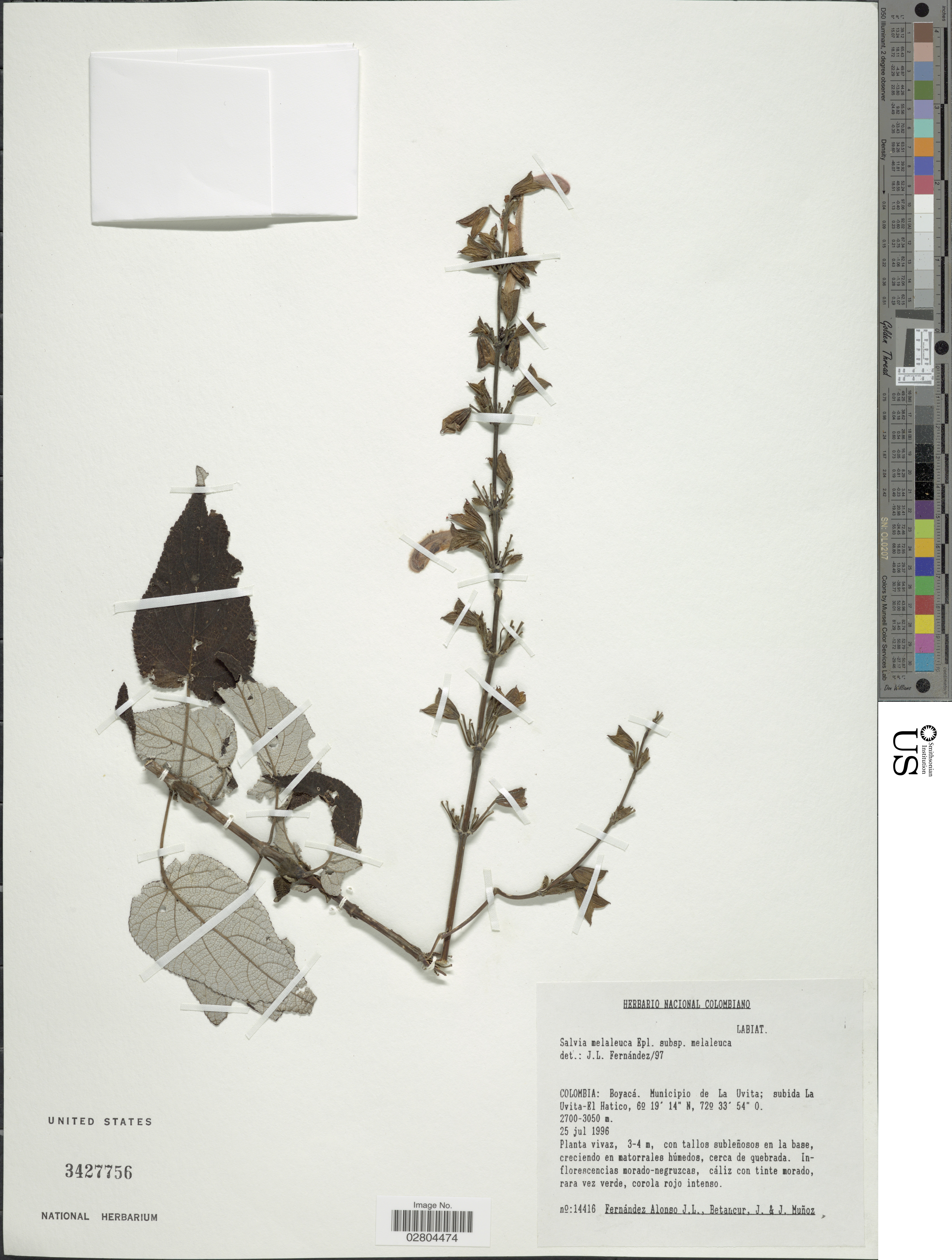

Scientific classification
- Kingdom: Plantae
- Clade: Tracheophytes
- Clade: Angiosperms
- Clade: Eudicots
- Clade: Asterids
- Order: Lamiales
- Family: Lamiaceae
- Genus: Salvia
- Species: S. melaleuca

Binomial name
- Salvia melaleuca Epling

Subspecies
- S. melaleuca subsp. melaleuca; S. melaleuca subsp. totensis J.R.I. Wood & Harley

= Salvia melaleuca =

Species of shrub

Salvia melaleuca is a perennial undershrub that is endemic to the north central region of the Eastern Cordillera in Colombia. It is a close relative of S. rubescens, with a villous and much larger corolla than that species. Salvia melaleuca grows approximately 0.5 to 2.5 m (1.6 to 8.2 ft) high, has a red corolla that is 3.5 to 4.5 cm (1.4 to 1.8 in) long, with the upper lip typically 9 mm (0.35 in) long but sometimes up to 15 mm (0.59 in).

== Subspecies ==
It is divided into two subspecies: S. melaleuca subsp. melaleuca and S. melaleuca subsp. totensis. Subsp. melaleuca has leaves that are smooth on the upper surface, and racemes with 6–10 verticillasters that are up to 25 cm long. Subsp. totensis has leaves that are hairy on the upper surface, with racemes that typically have 3–5 verticillasters, growing to 10 cm long.
