= Lepechinia paniculata =

Conservation status
- Vulnerable (IUCN 3.1)

Scientific classification
- Kingdom: Plantae
- Clade: Tracheophytes
- Clade: Angiosperms
- Clade: Eudicots
- Clade: Asterids
- Order: Lamiales
- Family: Lamiaceae
- Genus: Lepechinia
- Species: L. paniculata

Binomial name
- Lepechinia paniculata (Kunth) Epling

Species of plant

Lepechinia paniculata is a species of flowering plant in the family Lamiaceae. It is endemic to Ecuador, where its natural habitat is subtropical or tropical moist montane forests.
