= Lepechinia rossii =

Conservation status
- Critically Imperiled (NatureServe)

Scientific classification
- Kingdom: Plantae
- Clade: Tracheophytes
- Clade: Angiosperms
- Clade: Eudicots
- Clade: Asterids
- Order: Lamiales
- Family: Lamiaceae
- Genus: Lepechinia
- Species: L. rossii

Binomial name
- Lepechinia rossii S.Boyd & Mistretta

Species of flowering plant

Lepechinia rossii is a rare species of flowering plant in the mint family known by the common name Ross' pitcher sage.

It is endemic to the Transverse Ranges of California on the north edge of the Greater Los Angeles Area. This species was first described to science only in 2006.

== Distribution ==
The plant is known from four occurrences, two in the Topatopa Mountains of Ventura County near Fillmore, and two in the Sierra Pelona Mountains east of Castaic Lake in Los Angeles County. The former location spans about 3 kilometres (1.9 mi), and the latter location contains no more than about 1000 individual plants.

Its habitat is chaparral of the California chaparral and woodlands ecoregion.

== Description ==
Lepechinia rossii is a perennial herb or shrub with hairy, glandular herbage. The leaves have toothed or serrated oval blades measuring up to 13 centimeters long.

The inflorescence is an open raceme of flowers with large, leaflike bracts at the base. The flowers have bell-shaped calyces of reddish or purple-tinged sepals and bell-shaped white or purplish corollas.

== Taxonomy ==
In 1997 botanists Steve Boyd and Orlando Mistretta described a new species in the Lepechinia genus which they named Lepechinia rossii. Alongside the rest of the genus it is classified in the Lamiaceae family. The species has no synonyms or varieties.

== Conservation ==
Threats to this rare species include off-road vehicles, power line maintenance activity, petroleum drilling and exploration, introduced plant species such as brome grasses, and alterations in the fire regime in the southern California chaparral where it grows.
