= Eplingiella =

Scientific classification
- Kingdom: Plantae
- Clade: Tracheophytes
- Clade: Angiosperms
- Clade: Eudicots
- Clade: Asterids
- Order: Lamiales
- Family: Lamiaceae
- Genus: Eplingiella; Harley & J.F.B.Pastore

Genus of plants

Eplingiella is a genus of flowering plants belonging to the family Lamiaceae.

Its native range is eastern Brazil.

The genus name of Eplingiella is in honour of Carl Epling (1894–1968), an American botanist and taxonomist, and it was first published and described in Phytotaxa Vol.58 on page 21 in 2012.

Known species:

- Eplingiella brightoniae Harley
- Eplingiella cuniloides (Epling) Harley & J.F.B.Pastore
- Eplingiella fruticosa (Salzm. ex Benth.) Harley & J.F.B.Pastore
