= Lepechinia leucophylloides =

Scientific classification
- Kingdom: Plantae
- Clade: Tracheophytes
- Clade: Angiosperms
- Clade: Eudicots
- Clade: Asterids
- Order: Lamiales
- Family: Lamiaceae
- Genus: Lepechinia
- Species: L. leucophylloides

Binomial name
- Lepechinia leucophylloides (Ramamoorthy, Hiriart & Medrano) B.T.Drew, Cacho & Sytsma

Synonyms
- Neoeplingia leucophylloides Ramamoorthy, Hiriart & Medrano

Genus of flowering plants

Lepechinia leucophylloides is a species of flowering plant in the family Lamiaceae, endemic to the State of Hidalgo in Mexico. It was first described in 1982 as Neoeplingia leucophylloides, which was the only species in the genus Neoeplingia. Neoeplingia was found to be embedded within Lepechinia, so the species was transferred to that genus in 2014.
