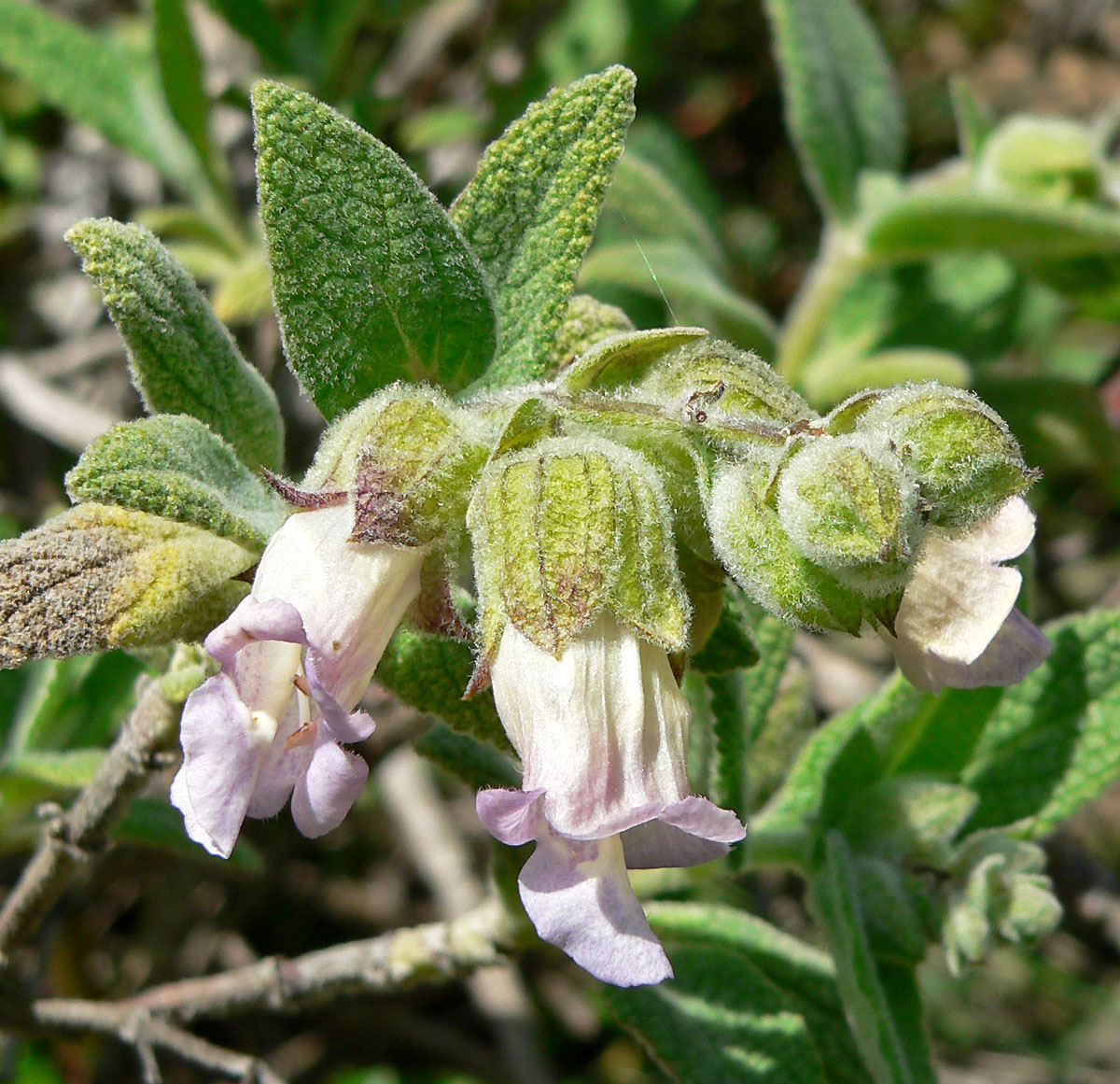
- Lepechinia calycina

Scientific classification
- Kingdom: Plantae
- Clade: Embryophytes
- Clade: Tracheophytes
- Clade: Spermatophytes
- Clade: Angiosperms
- Clade: Eudicots
- Clade: Asterids
- Order: Lamiales
- Family: Lamiaceae
- Subfamily: Nepetoideae
- Tribe: Mentheae
- Genus: Lepechinia; Willd.

Synonyms
- Alguelaguen Feuillée ex Adans.; Alguelagum Kuntze; Astemon Regel; Chaunostoma Donn.Sm.; Mahya Cordem.; Neoeplingia Ramamoorthy, Hiriart & Medrano; Phytoxis Molina; Sphacele Benth.; Ulricia Jacq. ex Steud.

= Lepechinia =

Genus of flowering plants

Lepechinia is a genus of plants in the mint family, Lamiaceae. It includes several species of plants known commonly as pitchersages (also pitcher sages). Plants of this genus can be found in Central and South America, Mexico, California, Hispaniola, and Hawaii, although the species in Hawaii is probably a human introduction. Many of them bear attractive pitcher-shaped flowers, often in shades of purple. The genus was named for the Russian botanist Ivan Ivanovich Lepechin. In 2011, the two monotypic genera Chaunostoma and Neoeplingia were shown to be part of Lepechinia.

== Species ==
As of February 2024, Plants of the World Online accepted the following species:

1. Lepechinia annae (Taub. ex Schwacke) Brade
2. Lepechinia anomala Epling - southern Brazil
3. Lepechinia bella Epling - Bolivia
4. Lepechinia betonicifolia (Lam.) Epling - Colombia, Ecuador
5. Lepechinia bullata (Kunth) Epling - Colombia, Ecuador, Venezuela
6. Lepechinia calycina (Benth.) Epling ex Munz – pitcher sage, woodbalm - California (Coast Ranges + northern Sierra Nevada)
7. Lepechinia cardiophylla Epling – Santa Ana pitcher sage - southern California, Baja California
8. Lepechinia caulescens (Ortega) Epling - Mexico, Guatemala
9. Lepechinia chilensis (Molina) R.Morales
10. Lepechinia cocuyensis J.R.I.Wood - Colombia
11. Lepechinia codon Epling - Peru
12. Lepechinia conferta (Benth.) Epling - Colombia, Venezuela
13. Lepechinia dioica J.A.Hart - Ecuador
14. Lepechinia flammea Mart.Gord. & Lozada-Pérez - Guerrero
15. Lepechinia floribunda (Benth.) Epling - Peru, Bolivia, Argentina
16. Lepechinia fragrans (Greene) Epling – island pitcher sage, fragrant pitcher sage - southern California including offshore Channel Islands
17. Lepechinia ganderi Epling – San Diego pitcher sage - southern California, Baja California
18. Lepechinia glomerata Epling - Jalisco
19. Lepechinia graveolens (Regel) Epling
20. Lepechinia hastata (A.Gray) Epling – pakata - Baja California and Baja California Sur, including Revillagigedo Islands; naturalized in Hawaii
21. Lepechinia heteromorpha (Briq.) Epling - Ecuador, Peru, Bolivia
22. Lepechinia lamiifolia (Benth.) Epling - Ecuador, Peru
23. Lepechinia lancifolia (Rusby) Epling - Bolivia
24. Lepechinia leucophylloides (Ramamoorthy, Hiriart & Medrano) B.T.Drew, Cacho & Sytsma - Hidalgo
25. Lepechinia marica Epling & Mathias - Peru
26. Lepechinia mecistandra (Donn.Sm.) H.K.Moon - Chiapas, Guatemala, El Salvador
27. Lepechinia mexicana (S.Schauer) Epling - central + northeastern Mexico
28. Lepechinia meyenii (Walp.) Epling - Peru, Bolivia, Argentina
29. Lepechinia mollis (Epling) Epling - Peru
30. Lepechinia mutica (Benth.) Epling - Ecuador
31. Lepechinia nelsonii (Fernald) Epling - central + southern Mexico
32. Lepechinia nubigena J.R.I.Wood & J.M.Mercado
33. Lepechinia paniculata (Kunth) Epling - Ecuador
34. Lepechinia radula (Benth.) Epling - Ecuador, Peru
35. Lepechinia rossii S.Boyd & Mistretta – Ross' pitcher sage - southern California (Los Angeles + Ventura Counties)
36. Lepechinia rufocampi Epling & Mathias - Ecuador
37. Lepechinia salviae (Lindl.) Epling - Chile
38. Lepechinia salviifolia (Kunth) Epling - Colombia, Venezuela
39. Lepechinia schiedeana (Schltdl.) Vatke - Mexico, Guatemala, Costa Rica, Panama, Colombia, Venezuela
40. Lepechinia scobina Epling - Peru
41. Lepechinia speciosa (A.St.-Hil. ex Benth.) Epling - southern Brazil
42. Lepechinia tomentosa (Benth.) Epling - Peru
43. Lepechinia urbani (Briq.) Epling - Hispaniola
44. Lepechinia velutina J.R.I.Wood - Colombia
45. Lepechinia vesiculosa (Benth.) Epling - Peru, Bolivia, Argentina
46. Lepechinia vulcanicola J.R.I.Wood - Colombia
47. Lepechinia yecorana Henrickson, Fishbein & T.Van Devender - Sonora
