= Lepechinia chilensis =

Scientific classification
- Kingdom: Plantae
- Clade: Tracheophytes
- Clade: Angiosperms
- Clade: Eudicots
- Clade: Asterids
- Order: Lamiales
- Family: Lamiaceae
- Genus: Lepechinia
- Species: L. chilensis

Binomial name
- Lepechinia chilensis (Molina) R. Morales, 2018

Species of plant

Lepechinia chilensis is a species of flowering plant in the family Lamiaceae. It is endemic to Chile, where it is distributed from the Coquimbo to the Los Lagos regions. It is locally known as salvia macho and lahuén.
