= Carl Epling =

American botanist and taxonomist (1894–1968)

Carl Clawson Epling (15 April 1894 – 17 November 1968) was an American botanist and taxonomist. Epling is best known for being the major authority on the Lamiaceae (mint family) of the Americas from the 1920s to the 1960s. In his later years he also developed an interest in genetics.

== History ==
Epling obtained his B.A. from the College of Agriculture at University of California, Berkeley in 1921. He received his M.A. in 1923 and Ph.D. in 1924 from Washington University in St. Louis, with a dissertation on the genus Monardella.

Epling's first academic position was as an instructor in botany at Oregon State College in 1921–22. He became staff member at the University of California, Los Angeles in 1924. In 1941, he was made a faculty research lecturer at UCLA. He was honored by UCLA with an honorary doctor of laws degree in 1963. He retired from UCLA in 1965.

From 1944 until his retirement, he held the title of systematist in the University of California Division of Agriculture and Natural Resources Agricultural Experiment Station.

He was also a researcher in population genetics. At the time of his death he was studying the flora of Ecuadorian rain forests. Carl Clawson Epling died in Santa Monica, in 1968.

=== Works ===
Epling published more than one hundred scientific works ranging from monographs to contributions to local floras, and described numerous genera and species new to science—including the well known psychoactive Salvia divinorum.

=== Honours ===
In 2012, the genus name of Eplingiella was named in his honour.

=== Personal ===
Epling was born in Waverly, Illinois, son of Allen Judson Epling and Inez S. Epling. He was married to Ruth Persons Epling; they had two children.

== See also ==
- 20th-century American botanists
- American taxonomists
