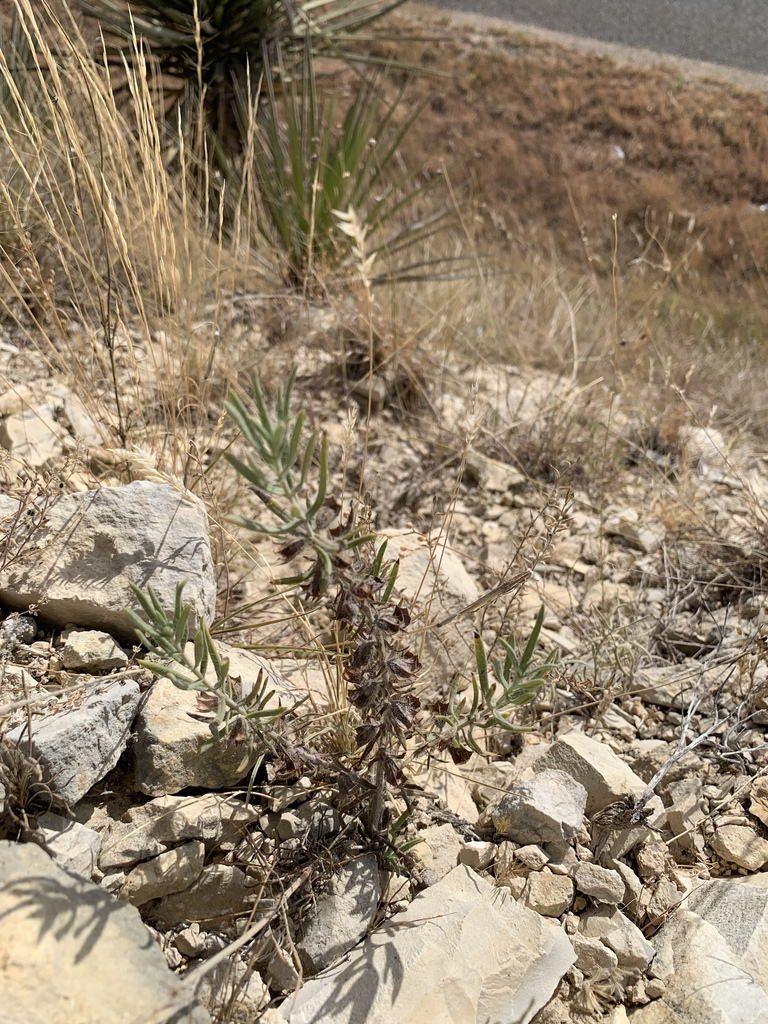

Scientific classification
- Kingdom: Plantae
- Clade: Tracheophytes
- Clade: Angiosperms
- Clade: Eudicots
- Clade: Asterids
- Order: Lamiales
- Family: Lamiaceae
- Genus: Salvia
- Species: S. whitehousei

Binomial name
- Salvia whitehousei G.Alziar

Synonyms
- Salvia dolichantha (Cory) Whitehouse

= Salvia whitehousei =

Species of flowering plant

Salvia whitehousei, the clustered sage, is a herbaceous perennial that is native to Texas.

== Taxonomy ==
Salvia whitehousei was originally described as "Salviastrum dolichanthum Cory" in 1930 by Victor Louis Cory. When the genus Salviastrum was merged into Salvia in 1949 by Eula Whitehouse, it became "Salvia dolichantha (Cory) Whitehouse". In 1988, because there was already a Salvia species from China named "Salvia dolichantha" (1934), Gabriel Alziar renamed the plant to the current Salvia whitehousei, in honor of Eula Whitehouse.
