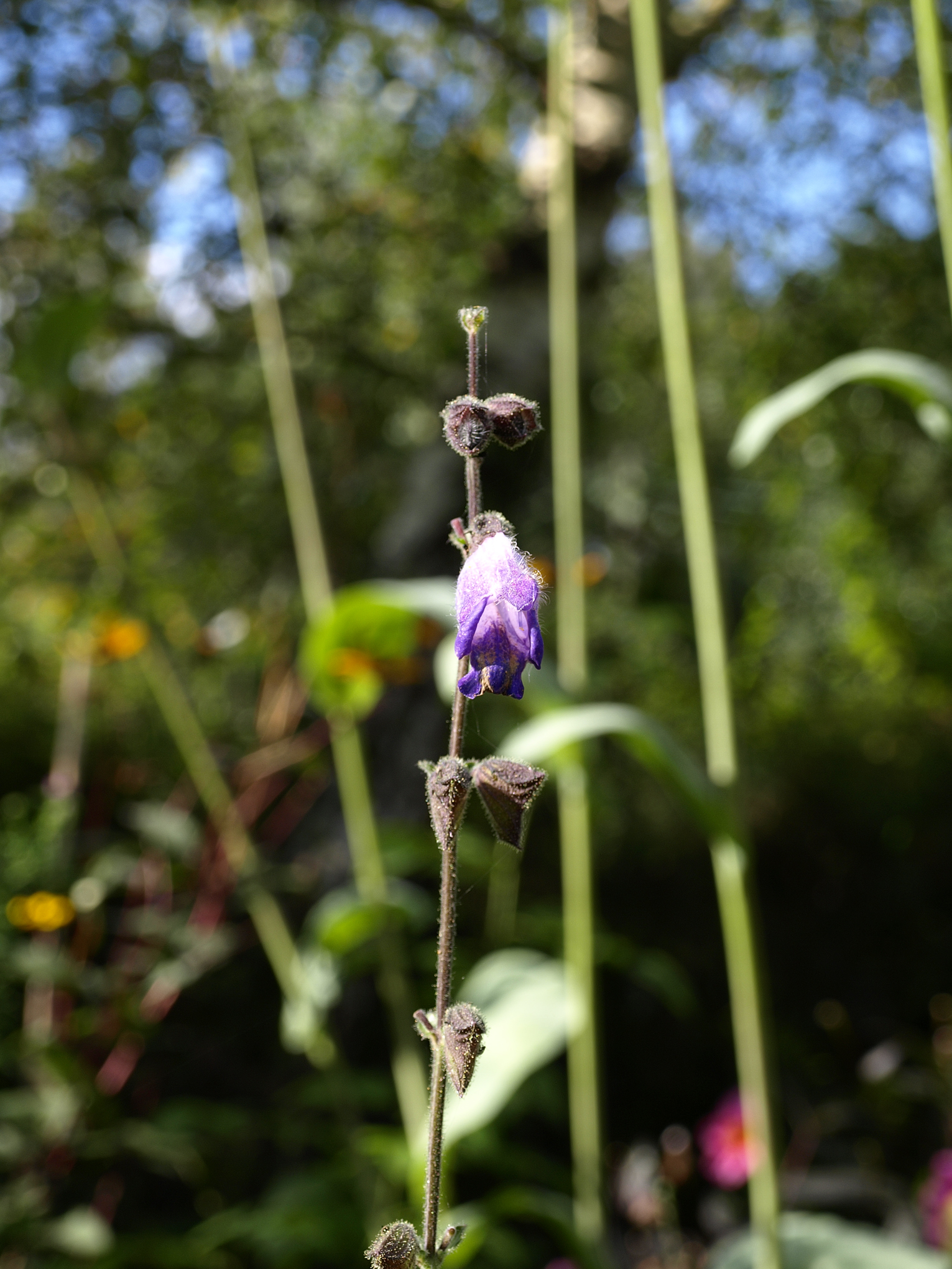

Scientific classification
- Kingdom: Plantae
- Clade: Tracheophytes
- Clade: Angiosperms
- Clade: Eudicots
- Clade: Asterids
- Order: Lamiales
- Family: Lamiaceae
- Genus: Salvia
- Species: S. dolichantha

Binomial name
- Salvia dolichantha E. Peter

= Salvia dolichantha =

Species of flowering plant

Salvia dolichantha is a herbaceous perennial native to Sichuan province in China, growing at 3,700 m (12,100 ft) elevation. It grows up to 80 cm (31 in) high, with purple flowers that are approximately 5 cm (2.0 in) long. The leaves are cordate-ovate to hastate-ovate, 6.5 to 9 cm (2.6 to 3.5 in) long and 5.5 to 9 cm (2.2 to 3.5 in) wide.
