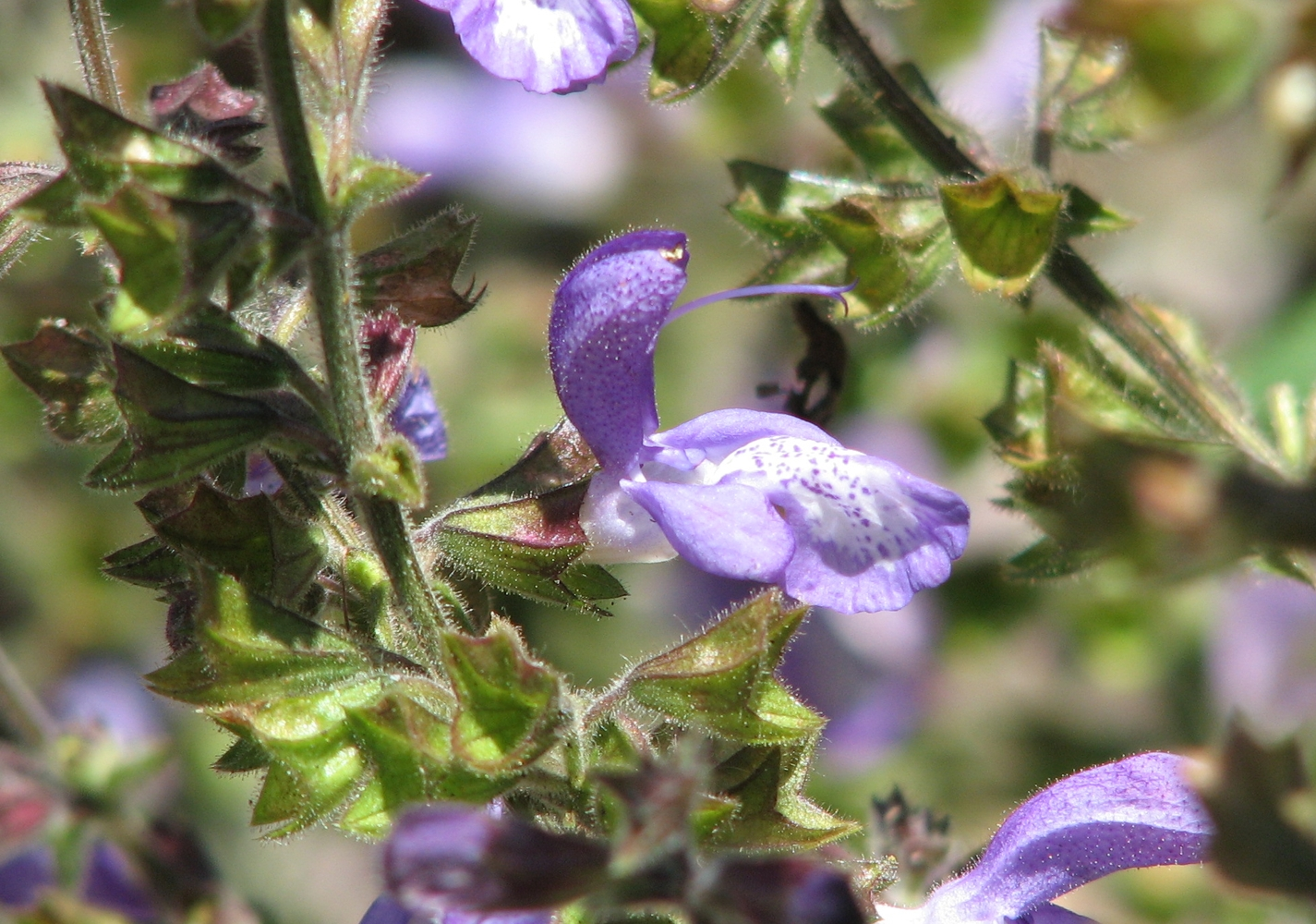

Scientific classification
- Kingdom: Plantae
- Clade: Tracheophytes
- Clade: Angiosperms
- Clade: Eudicots
- Clade: Asterids
- Order: Lamiales
- Family: Lamiaceae
- Genus: Salvia
- Species: S. forskaehlei

Binomial name
- Salvia forskaehlei L.

Synonyms
- Salvia bifida Forssk.; Salvia bithynica Briq. & Post; Salvia bulgarica Davidov; Salvia forskohlei L.; Salvia longepetiolata K.Koch; Salvia pontica Freyn & Bornm. ex Hand.-Mazz.; Terepis forskaehlei (L.) Raf.

= Salvia forskaehlei =

Species of flowering plant

Salvia forskaehlei, synonym Salvia forskohlei, is a flowering plant in the family Lamiaceae native to Bulgaria and Turkey. The spelling Salvia forsskaolei is also used. It is a herbaceous perennial plant. It grows up to 6,000 ft (1800 m) elevation in broad-leaved and coniferous forests, meadows, and on steep banks. It was named after Finnish explorer and naturalist Peter Forsskål, a student of Carl Linnaeus who collected plants in southwest Arabia in the 18th century.

== Description ==
The plant grows into large basal clumps 2 ft (0.6 m) tall and wide, with hairy leaves that are parsley-green in spring, turning dark green in summer. The flower whorls are few and widely spaced, with the flower a showy two-lipped violet-blue color that has white streaks with yellow markings on the lower lip.

== Taxonomy ==
The species was first described by Carl Linnaeus in his 1767 work Mantissa Plantarum where he spelt the epithet forskaehlei. In the 12th edition of Systema Naturae, also published in 1767, Linnaeus spelt the epithet forskohlei, although referring back to Mantissa Plantarum. Plants of the World Online treats S. forskohlei as a synonym of S. forskaehlei.
