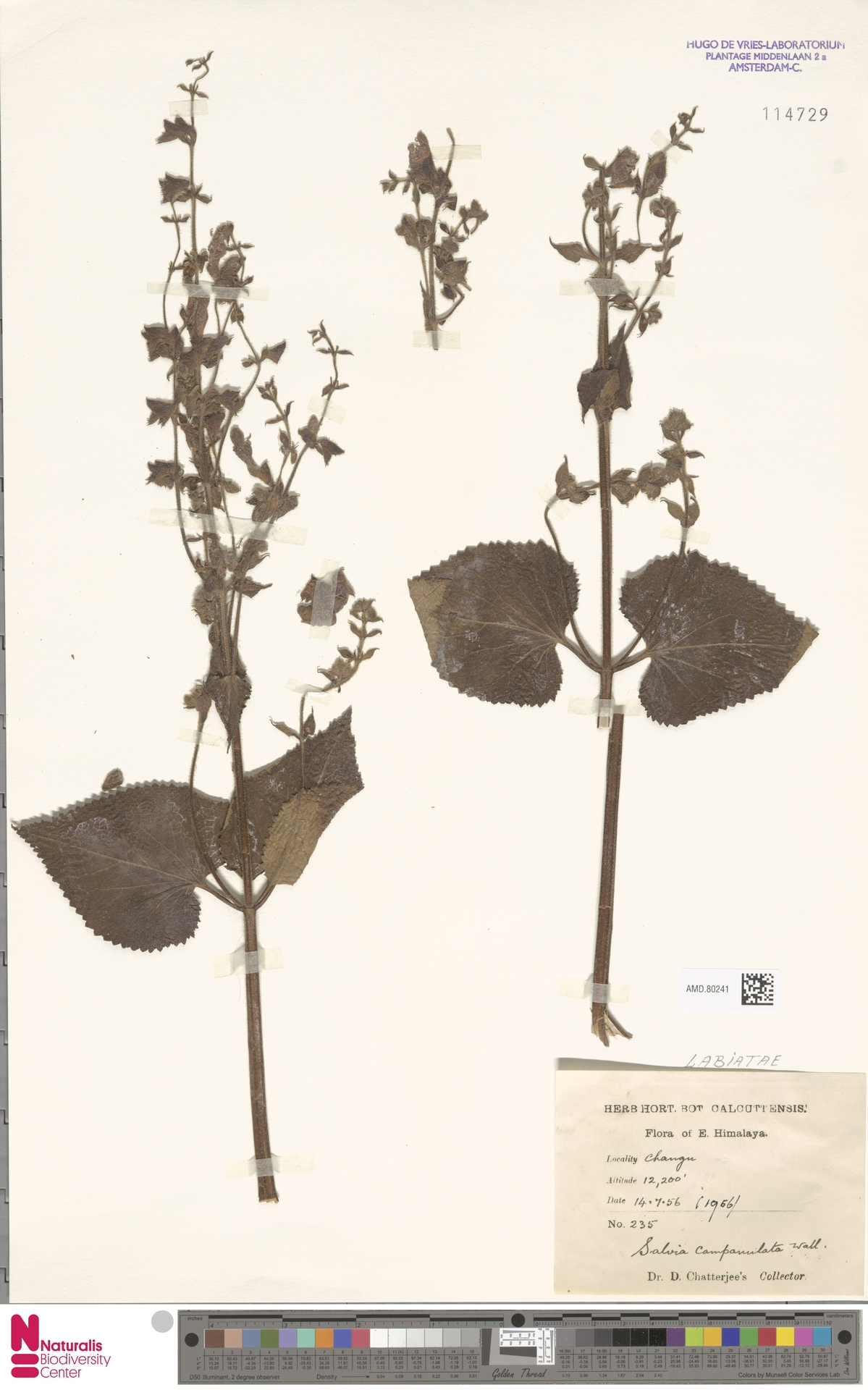

Scientific classification
- Kingdom: Plantae
- Clade: Tracheophytes
- Clade: Angiosperms
- Clade: Eudicots
- Clade: Asterids
- Order: Lamiales
- Family: Lamiaceae
- Genus: Salvia
- Species: S. campanulata

Binomial name
- Salvia campanulata Wall. ex Benth.

Varieties
- S. campanulata var. campanulata; S. campanulata var. codonantha E. Peter; S. campanulata var. fissa E. Peter; S. campanulata var. hirtella E. Peter

= Salvia campanulata =

Species of flowering plant

Salvia campanulata is a perennial plant that is native to Xizang and Yunnan provinces in China, along with locations in Bhutan, India (Sikkim), Myanmar, and Nepal. It is typically found growing at 800 to 3,800 m (2,600 to 12,500 ft) elevation in and around forests, on hillsides, and in valleys. There are four named varieties.

The plant grows on erect stems, reaching 43 to 80 cm (17 to 31 in) tall, with leaves that are cordate to ovate-truncate and growing 4 to 18 cm (1.6 to 7.1 in) long and 3.5 to 13.5 cm (1.4 to 5.3 in) wide. Inflorescences are widely spaced verticillasters in terminal raceme-panicles that are 10 to 20 cm (3.9 to 7.9 in) long, with a yellow corolla that is approximately 2.7 cm (1.1 in).

The named varieties are due to differences in leaf hairs and texture, and differences in the bract and calyx:

- Salvia campanulata var. campanulata
- Salvia campanulata var. codonantha
- Salvia campanulata var. fissa
- Salvia campanulata var. hirtella
