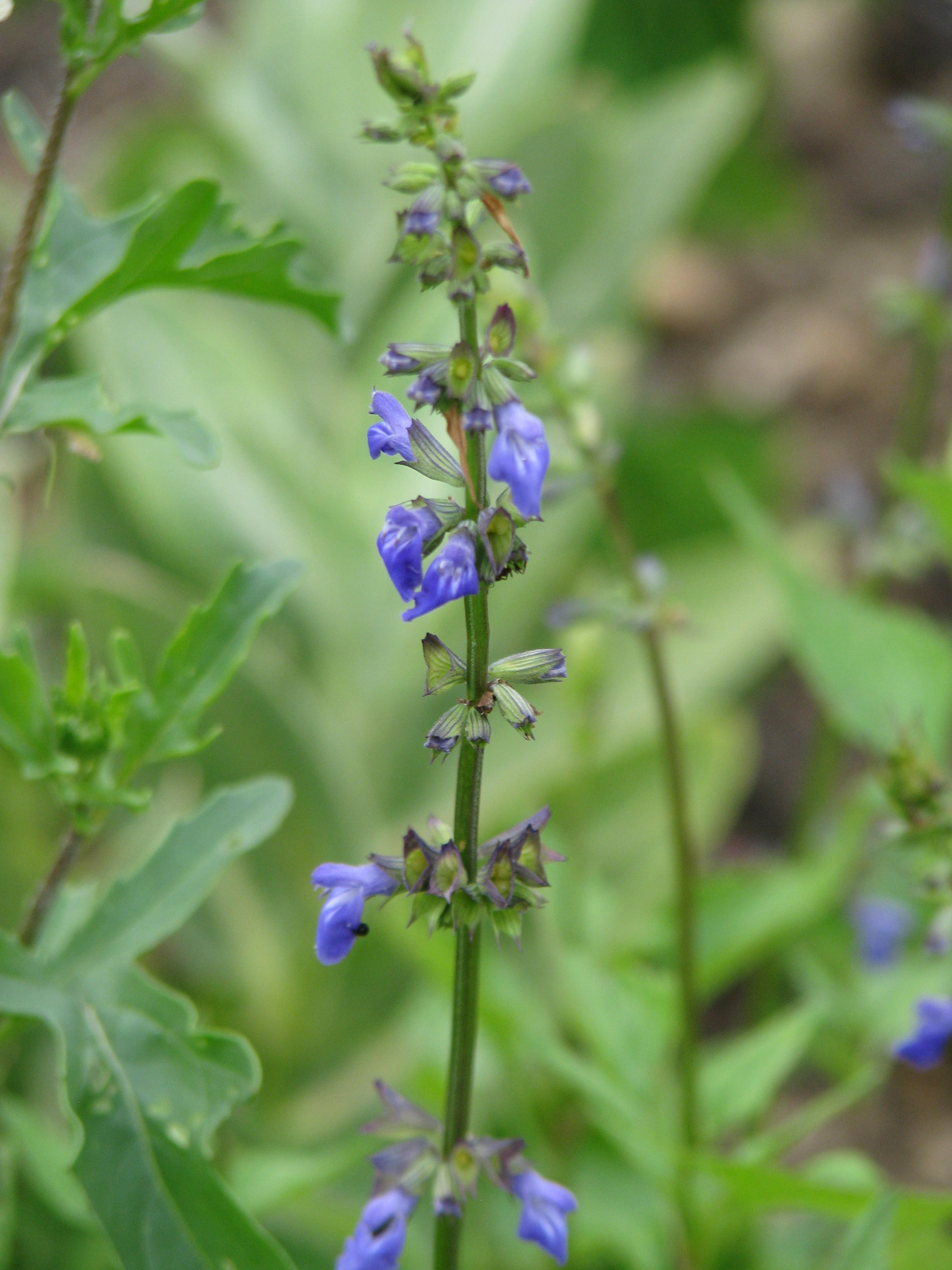

Conservation status
- Vulnerable (NatureServe)

Scientific classification
- Kingdom: Plantae
- Clade: Tracheophytes
- Clade: Angiosperms
- Clade: Eudicots
- Clade: Asterids
- Order: Lamiales
- Family: Lamiaceae
- Genus: Salvia
- Species: S. arizonica

Binomial name
- Salvia arizonica Gray

= Salvia arizonica =

Species of flowering plant

Salvia arizonica is a species of sage known commonly as desert indigo sage and Arizona sage. It can be distinguished from its relatives by its triangular, serrated leaves. It blooms copiously in small blue flowers. This is a vigorous sage which propagates via underground spreading runners and seeds. It is native to Arizona, New Mexico, and Texas. It is frequently found at higher elevations (2100–2900 m).

== Description ==
It is a perennial with shiny, dark-green leaves and clusters of indigo flowers. It can get up to heights of 2 feet tall. The fruit are nutlets. The bloom time is in the months of July, August, and September. The flowers are small, semi-tubular, and are dark blue with a white throat. The green, thin stems hold the clusters of flowers above the foliage. The leaves are in an elongated triangular shape with pronounced veins. The stems are square with creeping rootstocks. The leaves are glabrous on both sides, deltate-ovate in shape, and have small teeth. The flowers are in interrupted spikes or heads, the calyx is 2 lipped with small teeth. The two fruits are smooth.
