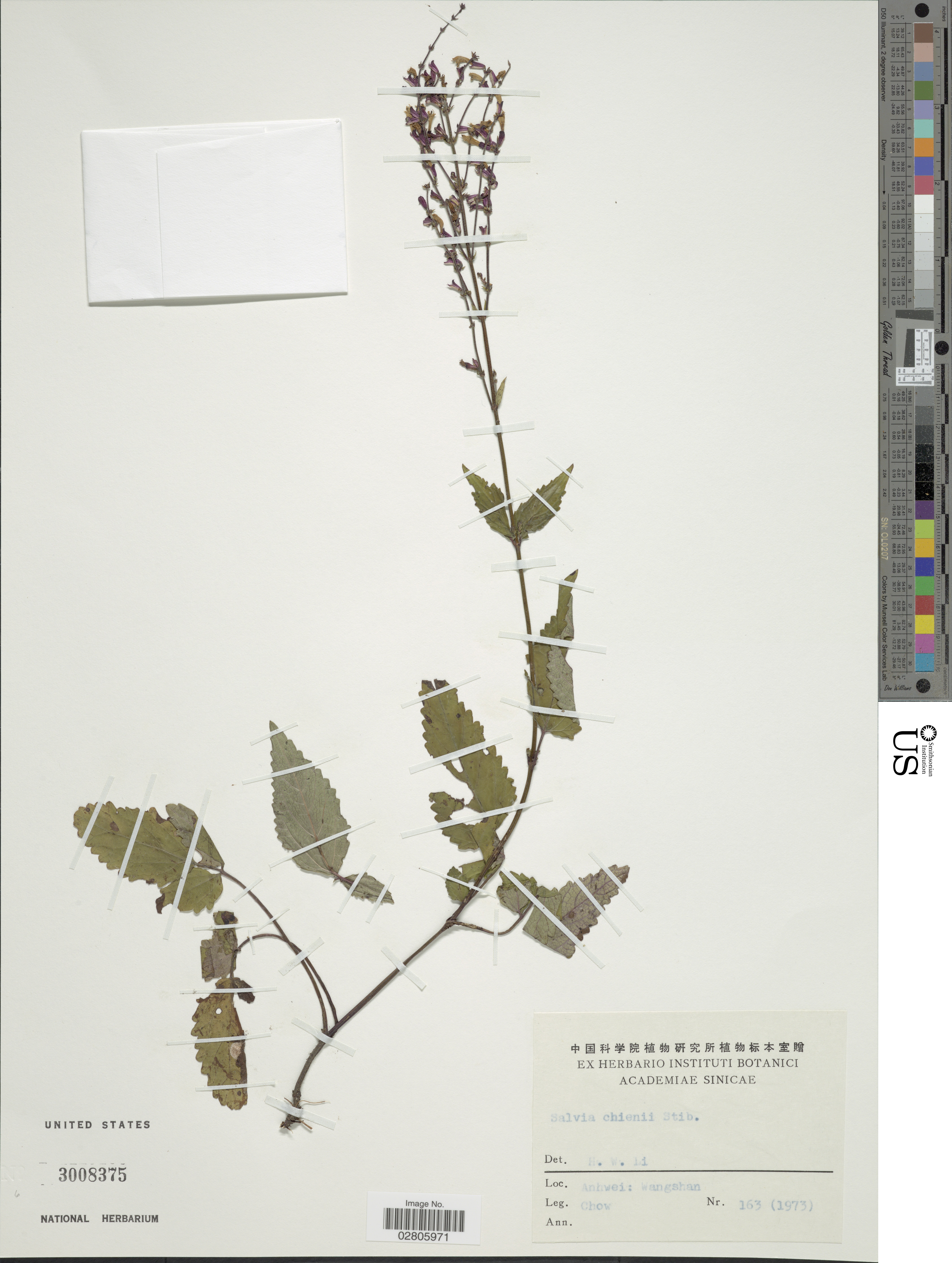

Scientific classification
- Kingdom: Plantae
- Clade: Embryophytes
- Clade: Tracheophytes
- Clade: Spermatophytes
- Clade: Angiosperms
- Clade: Eudicots
- Clade: Asterids
- Order: Lamiales
- Family: Lamiaceae
- Genus: Salvia
- Species: S. chienii

Binomial name
- Salvia chienii E.Peter

Varieties
- S. chienii var. chienii; S. chienii var. wuyuania Sun

= Salvia chienii =

Species of flowering plant

Salvia chienii (Mount Huang sage) is a perennial plant that is native to Anhui and Jiangxi provinces in China, growing on hillsides and streamsides at around 700 m (2,300 ft) elevation. S. chienii grows on erect stems to 20 to 45 cm (7.9 to 17.7 in) tall, with simple and compound leaves. Inflorescences are widely spaced 3-7 flowered verticillasters in terminal or axillary racemes and panicles, with a purple corolla that is 1 to 1.3 cm (0.39 to 0.51 in).

There are two named varieties. S. chienii var. chienii has stems, leaves, and petioles with soft fine hairs, a corolla that is 1 cm (0.39 in) long, and is native to hillsides in Anhui province. S. chienii var. wuyuania has no hairs on the stems, leaves, and petioles, a slightly larger corolla, and grows on streamsides in Jiangxi province.
