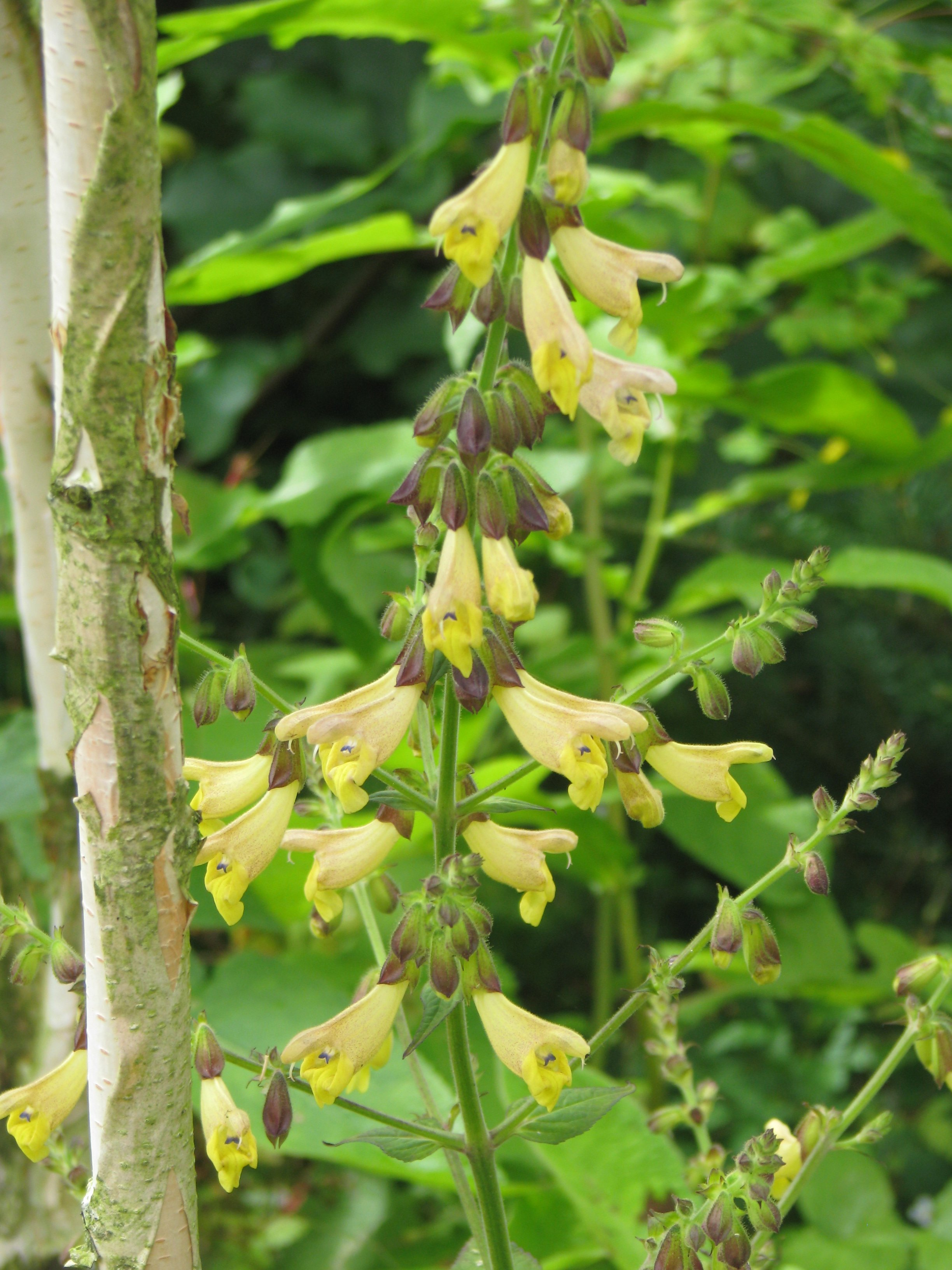

Scientific classification
- Kingdom: Plantae
- Clade: Tracheophytes
- Clade: Angiosperms
- Clade: Eudicots
- Clade: Asterids
- Order: Lamiales
- Family: Lamiaceae
- Genus: Salvia
- Species: S. omeiana

Binomial name
- Salvia omeiana E. Peter

Varieties
- S. omeiana var. omeiana; S. omeiana var. grandibracteata E. Peter

= Salvia omeiana =

Species of flowering plant

Salvia omeiana (the Mount Emei sage) is a perennial plant that is native to forest edges and hillsides in Sichuan province in China, growing at 1,400 to 3,100 m (4,600 to 10,200 ft) elevation. It is a robust erect-growing plant reaching .4 to 1 m (1.3 to 3.3 ft), with broad cordate-ovate to hastate-ovate leaves that are 10 to 16 cm (3.9 to 6.3 in) long and 6.5 to 14.5 cm (2.6 to 5.7 in) wide. Inflorescences are raceme-panicles, with a 2.5 to 3.5 cm (0.98 to 1.38 in) yellow corolla.

There are two varieties: Salvia omeiana var. omeiana has an ovate shaped bract, and no hairs inside the corolla tube. Salvia omeiana var. grandibracteata has a more lanceolate bract, and is slightly hairy inside the corolla tube.
