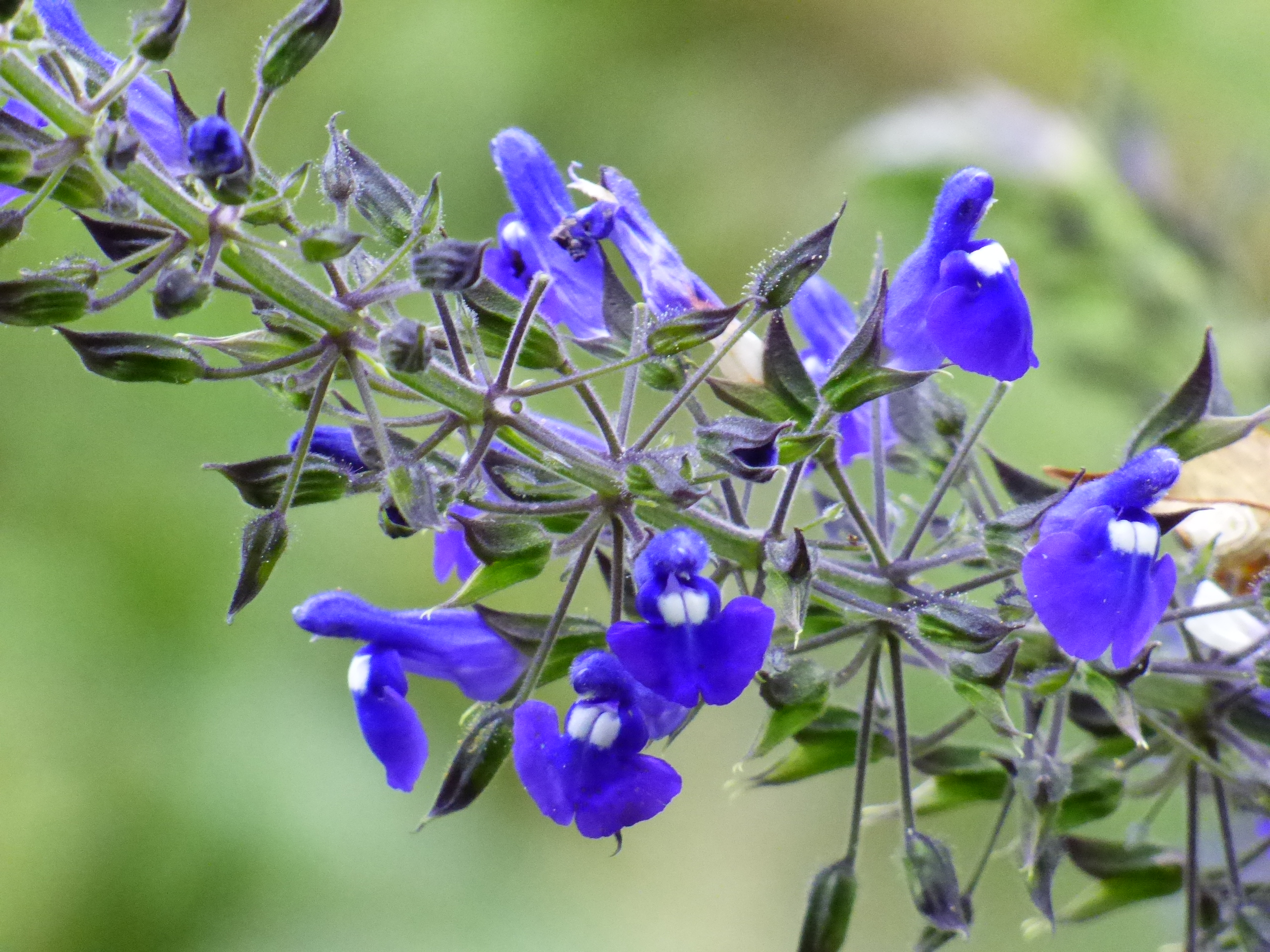

Scientific classification
- Kingdom: Plantae
- Clade: Tracheophytes
- Clade: Angiosperms
- Clade: Eudicots
- Clade: Asterids
- Order: Lamiales
- Family: Lamiaceae
- Genus: Salvia
- Species: S. amethystina

Binomial name
- Salvia amethystina J. E. Smith

Subspecies
- S. amethystina subsp. amethystina; S. amethystina subsp. ampelophylla (Epling) J. R. I. Wood& R. Harley

= Salvia amethystina =

Species of shrub

Salvia amethystina is a large aromatic undershrub that is endemic to Colombia. It is found in cloud forests and in bushy ground, often in riparian areas by streams, at 2,500 to 3,500 m (8,200 to 11,500 ft) elevation. The plant reaches .5 to 1.5 m (1.6 to 4.9 ft) tall, and sometimes taller, with ovate leaves that are 4 to 12 cm (1.6 to 4.7 in) long and 2 to 7 cm (0.79 to 2.76 in) wide. The corolla is very large, 1.7 to 3 cm (0.67 to 1.18 in) long, and usually blue, rarely purple.

Salvia amethystina is divided into two subspecies: S. amethystina subsp. amethystina and S. amethystina subsp. ampelophylla, differentiated by the number and size of the flowers.
