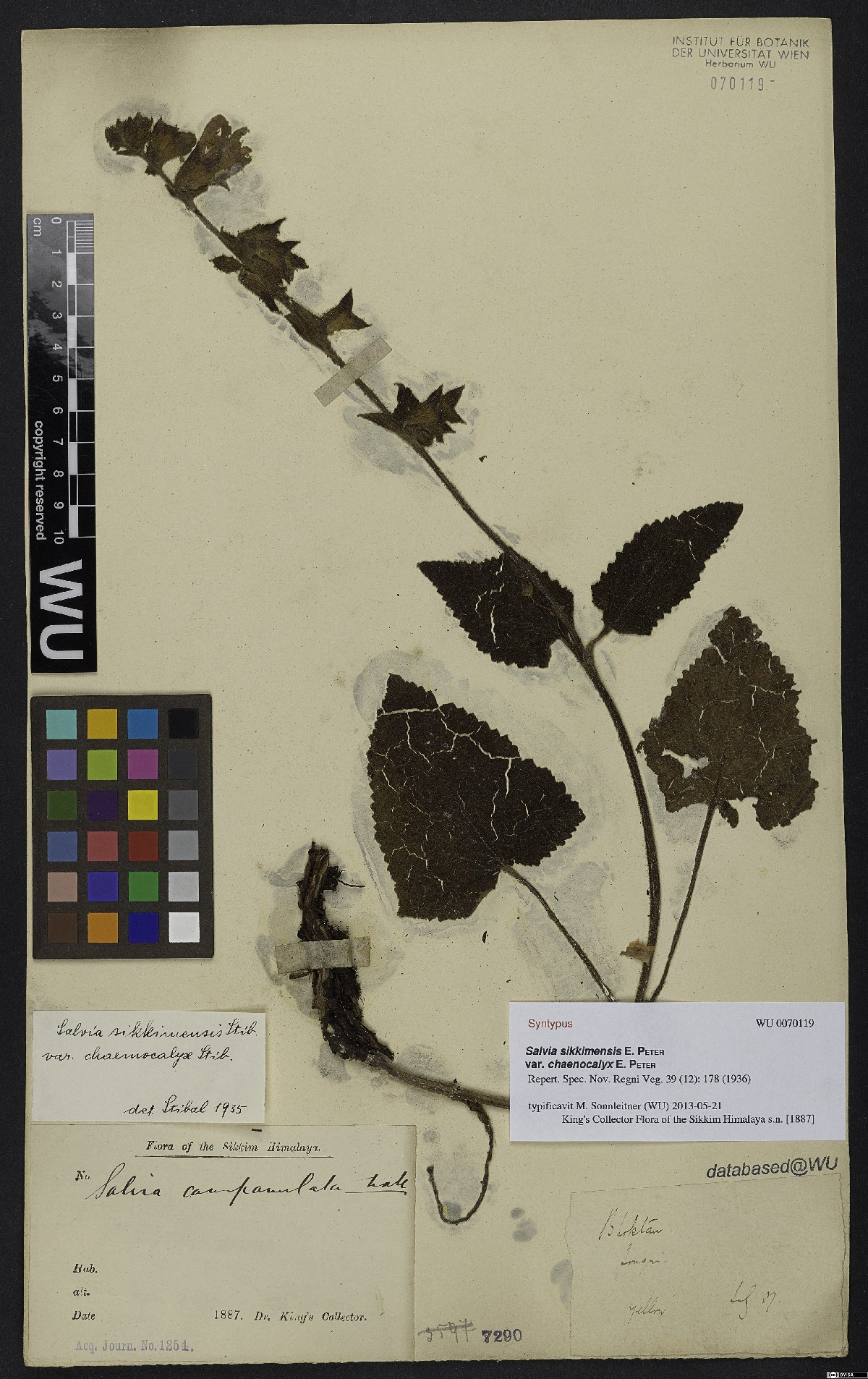

Scientific classification
- Kingdom: Plantae
- Clade: Tracheophytes
- Clade: Angiosperms
- Clade: Eudicots
- Clade: Asterids
- Order: Lamiales
- Family: Lamiaceae
- Genus: Salvia
- Species: S. sikkimensis

Binomial name
- Salvia sikkimensis E. Peter

Varieties
- S. sikkimensis var. sikkimensis; S. sikkimensis var. chaenocalyx E. Peter

= Salvia sikkimensis =

Species of flowering plant

Salvia sikkimensis is a perennial plant that is native to Xizang province in China, along with locations in Bhutan and India (Sikkim). It is typically found growing in and around forests, on hillsides, and streamsides at 3,300 m (10,800 ft) elevation.

The plant grows on one or two erect ascending stems, with ovate leaves that are approximately 12 cm (4.7 in) long and 9.5 cm (3.7 in) wide. Inflorescences are terminal raceme-panicles that are 6 to 15 cm (2.4 to 5.9 in) long, with a yellow-white or reddish and purple spotted corolla that is approximately 2.8 cm (1.1 in).

There are two named varieties. Salvia sikkimensis var. sikkimensis is not very robust and has a campanulate calyx. Salvia campanulata var. chaenocalyx is a robust plant with a funnelform-campanulate calyx.
