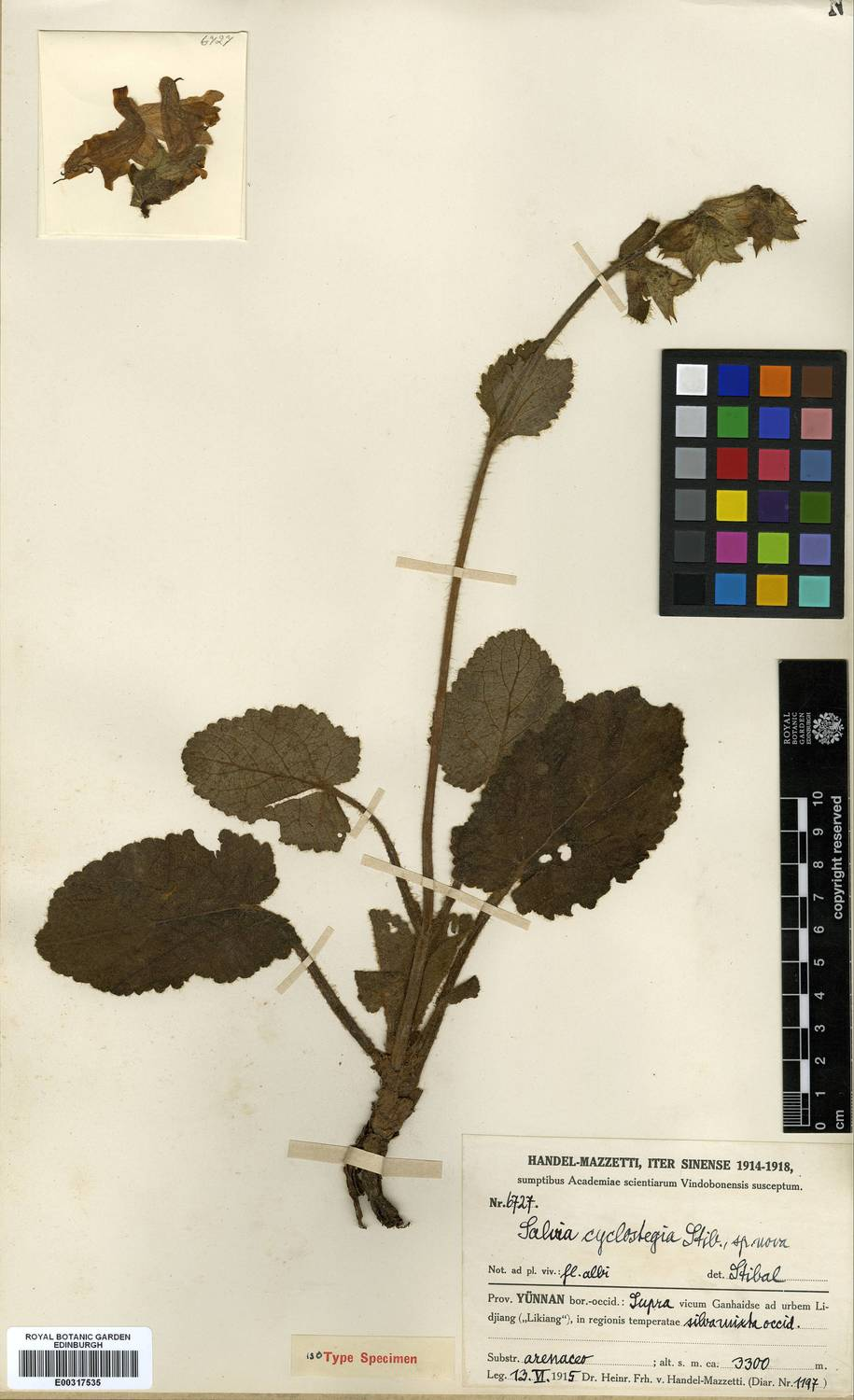

Scientific classification
- Kingdom: Plantae
- Clade: Tracheophytes
- Clade: Angiosperms
- Clade: Eudicots
- Clade: Asterids
- Order: Lamiales
- Family: Lamiaceae
- Genus: Salvia
- Species: S. cyclostegia

Binomial name
- Salvia cyclostegia E. Peter

Varieties
- S. cyclostegia var. cyclostegia; S. cyclostegia var. purpurascens C. Y. Wu

= Salvia cyclostegia =

Species of flowering plant

Salvia cyclostegia (the roundleaf sage) is a perennial plant that is native to forests, grasslands, and hillsides in Sichuan and Yunnan provinces in China, growing at elevations from 2,700 to 3,300 m (8,900 to 10,800 ft). The leaves are broadly ovate to circular, and range in size from 2.3 to 13 cm (0.91 to 5.12 in) long and 1.2 to 6.5 cm (0.47 to 2.56 in) wide.

Inflorescences are racemes or panicles up to 20 cm (7.9 in) long, with a 2 to 3 cm (0.79 to 1.18 in) corolla.

There are two varieties: Salvia cyclostegia var. cyclostegia has a flower that is white, yellowish, or creamy yellow with some grey spotting. Salvia cyclostegia var. purpurascens has a purplish or reddish flower.
