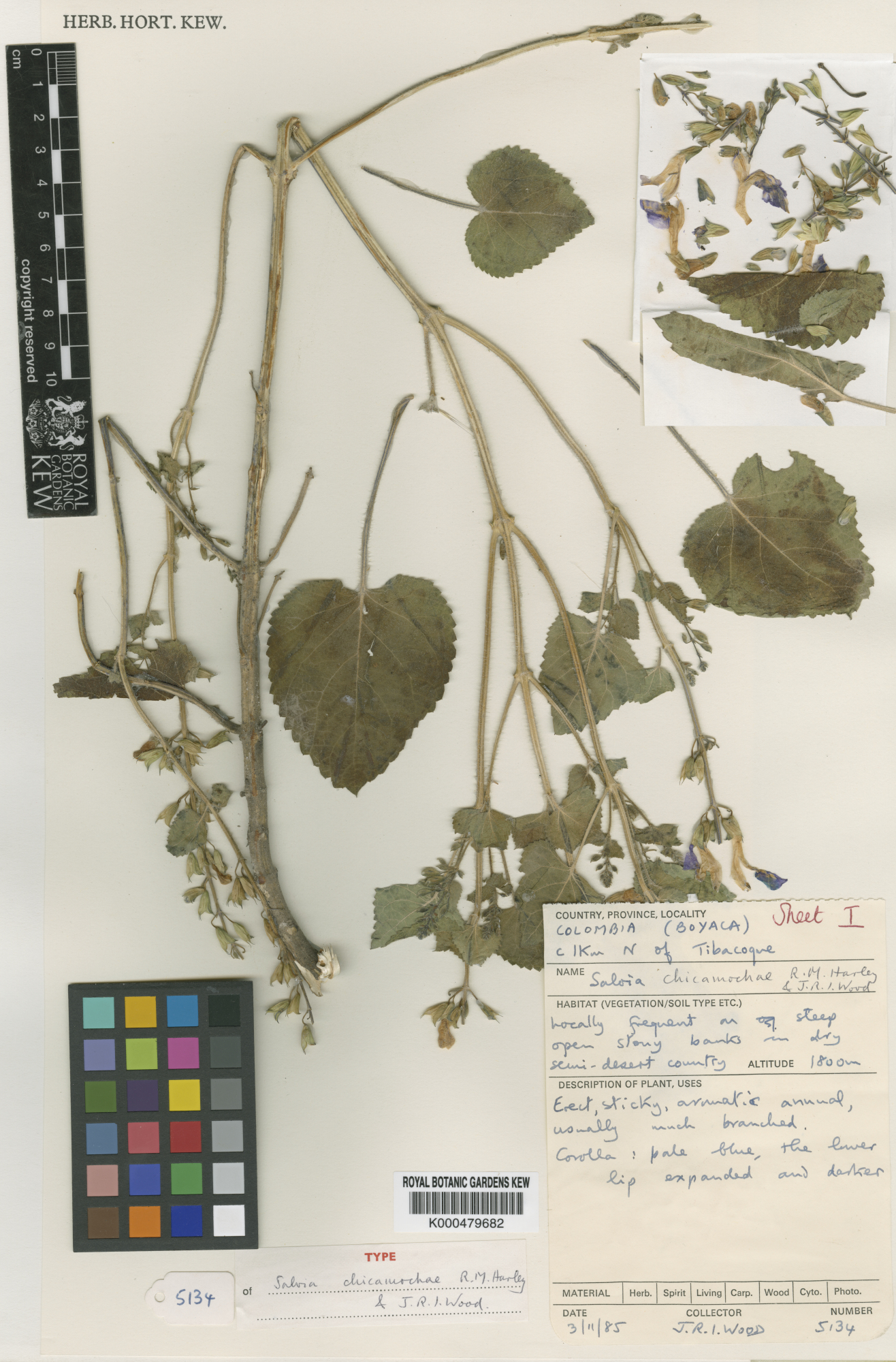

Scientific classification
- Kingdom: Plantae
- Clade: Tracheophytes
- Clade: Angiosperms
- Clade: Eudicots
- Clade: Asterids
- Order: Lamiales
- Family: Lamiaceae
- Genus: Salvia
- Species: S. chicamochae

Binomial name
- Salvia chicamochae J.R.I. Wood & Harley

= Salvia chicamochae =

Species of herb

Salvia chicamochae is an annual herb that is endemic to the Chicamocha canyon, in the far north of Boyacá in Colombia. It is found at 1,200 to 1,800 m (3,900 to 5,900 ft) elevation, on steep rocky slopes, in open arid bushland.

Salvia chicamochae is sticky and aromatic, growing erect up to 20 to 70 cm (7.9 to 27.6 in) high. The ovate leaves are 5 to 7 cm (2.0 to 2.8 in) long and 3.5 to 6 cm (1.4 to 2.4 in) wide.

The inflorescence is of simple terminal racemes, 10 to 20 cm (3.9 to 7.9 in) long. The 10 mm (0.39 in) cylindrical corolla tube is white, the 10 mm (0.39 in) upper lip pale blue, and the 20 mm (0.79 in) lower lip bright blue, flowering from October to December.
