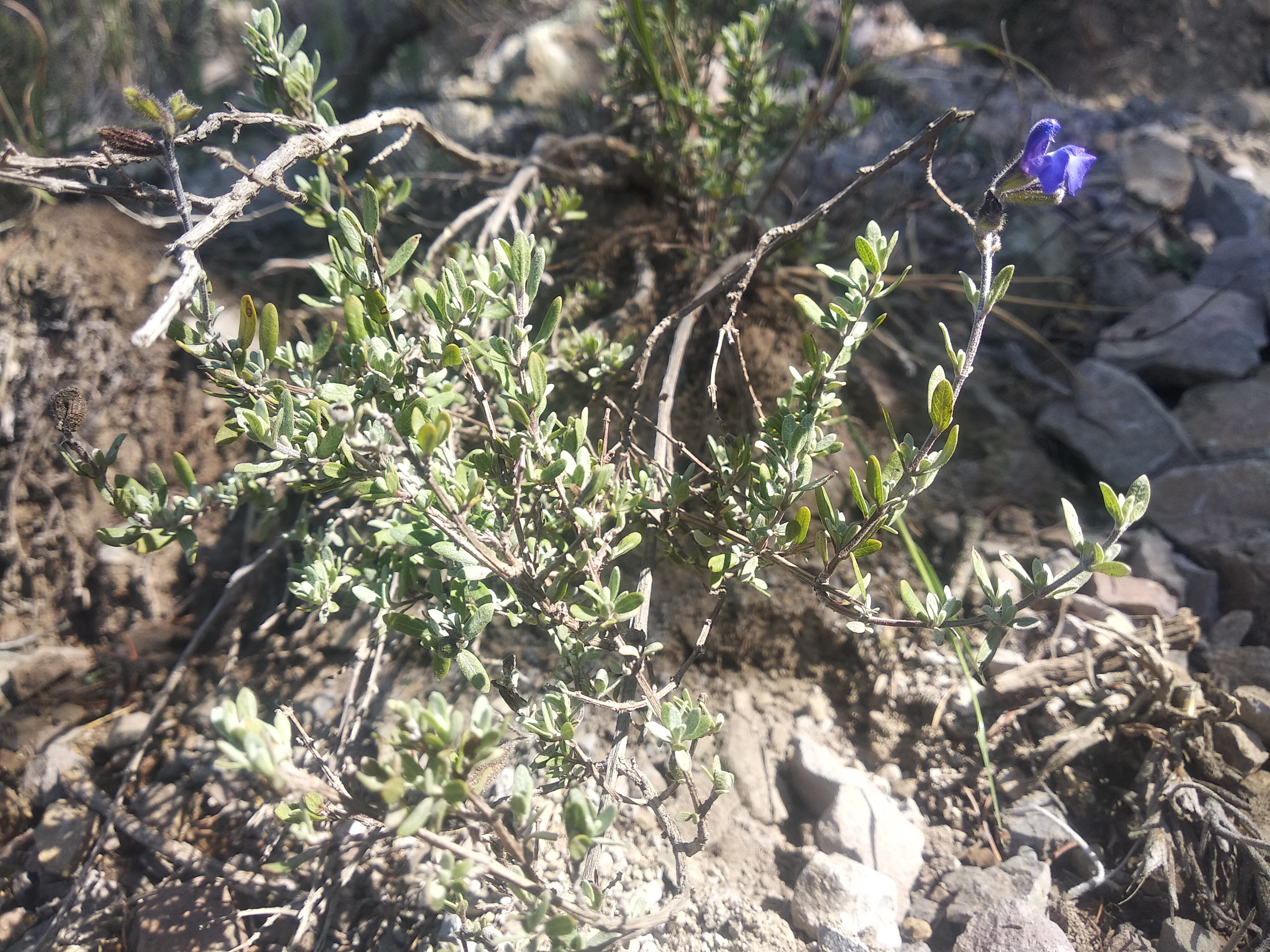

Scientific classification
- Kingdom: Plantae
- Clade: Tracheophytes
- Clade: Angiosperms
- Clade: Eudicots
- Clade: Asterids
- Order: Lamiales
- Family: Lamiaceae
- Genus: Salvia
- Species: S. thymoides

Binomial name
- Salvia thymoides Benth.

= Salvia thymoides =

Species of shrub

Salvia thymoides is an evergreen perennial shrub native to a small region in Mexico on the border of Oaxaca and Puebla states, growing at elevations from 7,000 feet (2,100 m) to 9,000 feet (2,700 m). Its native habitat is cloud forest, with the mountains catching regular moisture in the form of fog and rain. The plant was named by the botanist George Bentham in 1833, with the specific epithet, thymoides, referring to the small leaves which resemble those of thyme. It has a limited use in horticulture, introduced in the 1980s.

Salvia thymoides is an upright plant that reaches 1 foot (0.30 m) tall and wide, with grey-green 0.25 inches (0.64 cm) leaves that are evergreen and profusely cover the plant. The 0.5 inches (1.3 cm) flowers are purple-blue, and held in a tiny dark purple calyx, growing on whorls that are held on a short inflorescence that is 2 inches (5.1 cm) long.
