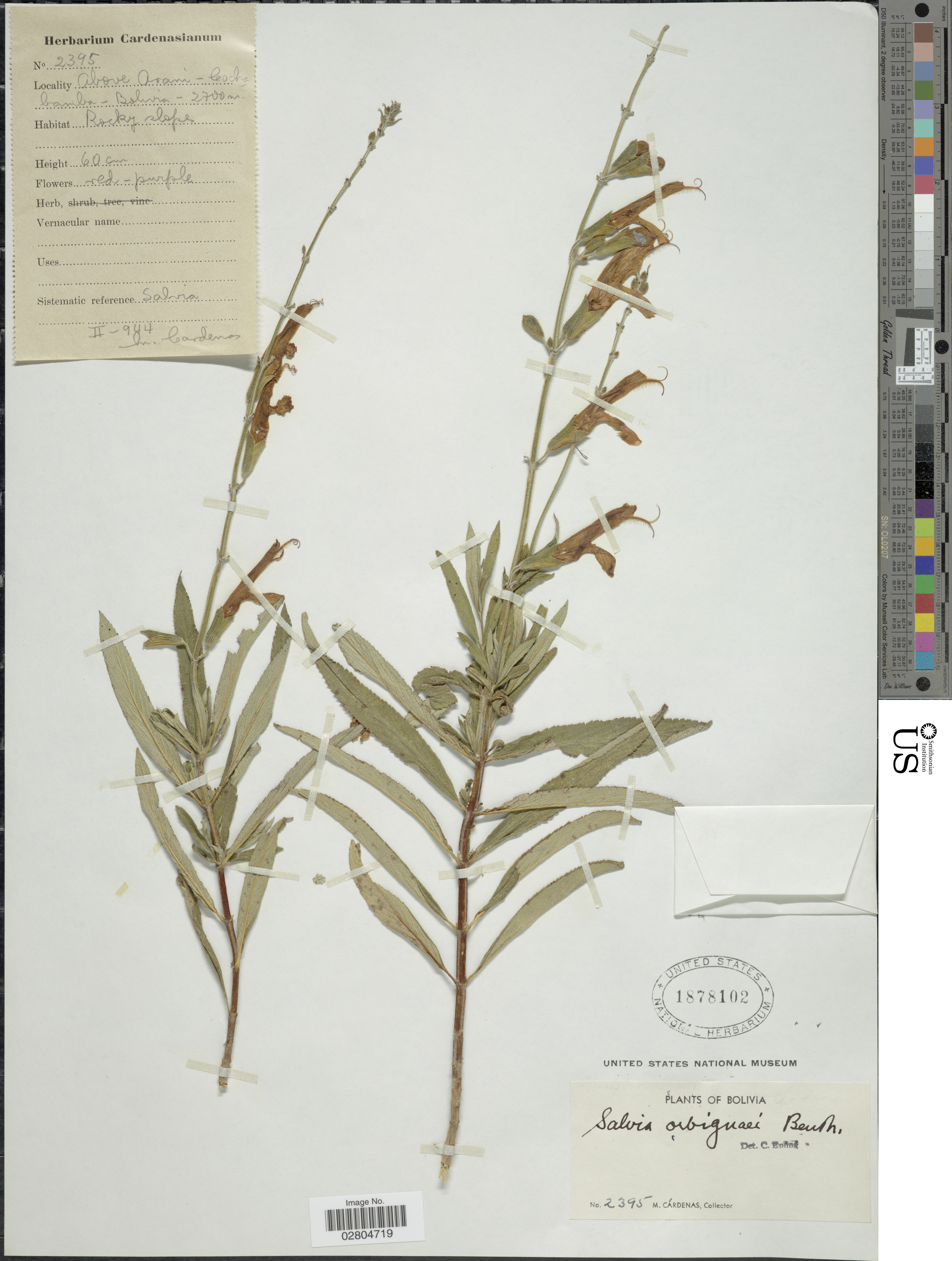

Scientific classification
- Kingdom: Plantae
- Clade: Tracheophytes
- Clade: Angiosperms
- Clade: Eudicots
- Clade: Asterids
- Order: Lamiales
- Family: Lamiaceae
- Genus: Salvia
- Species: S. orbignaei

Binomial name
- Salvia orbignaei Benth.

Synonyms
- Salvia cochabambensis Rusby; Salvia kuntzeana Briq. Salvia chariantha Briq.

= Salvia orbignaei =

Species of shrub

Salvia orbignaei is an undershrub that is endemic to Bolivia, growing on rocky slopes with other low shrubs at 2,400 to 3,400 metres (7,900 to 11,200 ft) elevation. It frequently appears following landslides or road building.

S. orbignaei grows .5 to 1 metre (1.6 to 3.3 ft) high, with subsessile leaves that are 2 to 9 cm (0.79 to 3.54 in) by .8 to 1.3 cm (0.31 to 0.51 in). The inflorescence of lax terminal racemes grows 5 to 20 cm (2.0 to 7.9 in) long, with mostly 2–4-flowered verticillasters and a pinkish-purple corolla that is 3.5 to 4.5 cm (1.4 to 1.8 in) long.
