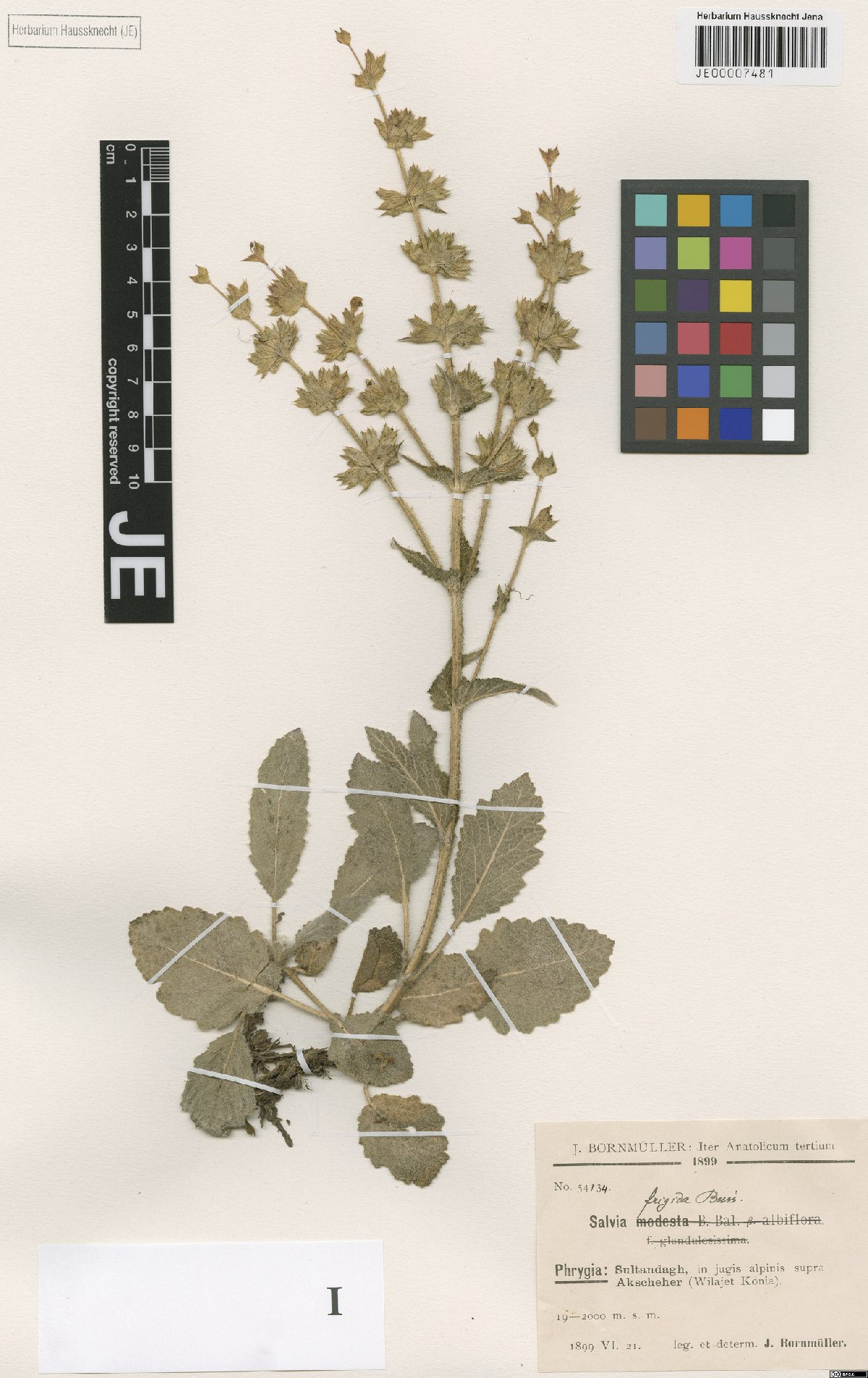

Scientific classification
- Kingdom: Plantae
- Clade: Tracheophytes
- Clade: Angiosperms
- Clade: Eudicots
- Clade: Asterids
- Order: Lamiales
- Family: Lamiaceae
- Genus: Salvia
- Species: S. frigida

Binomial name
- Salvia frigida Boiss.

Synonyms
- Salvia gilliatii Turrill; Salvia oreades Schott & Kotschy ex Boiss. Salvia spinulosa Montbret & Aucher ex Benth.

= Salvia frigida =

Species of plant in the mint family

Salvia frigida is a herbaceous perennial in the family Lamiaceae. It is native to northern Iraq, northwestern Iran, and eastern Turkey growing at 900 to 2,500 m (3,000 to 8,200 ft) elevation. It is often found growing in Anatolia, on woodland edges, meadows, limestone slopes, and crevices. The specific epithet, frigida, refers to the cold regions where it typically grows.

This very small Salvia usually puts up one 30 cm (12 in) flowering stem. The 6 cm (2.4 in) basal leaves have long wooly hairs, with the leaves sometimes surviving mild winters. The 2.5 cm (0.98 in) flowers are white or pale lilac, growing in whorls of two to six.
