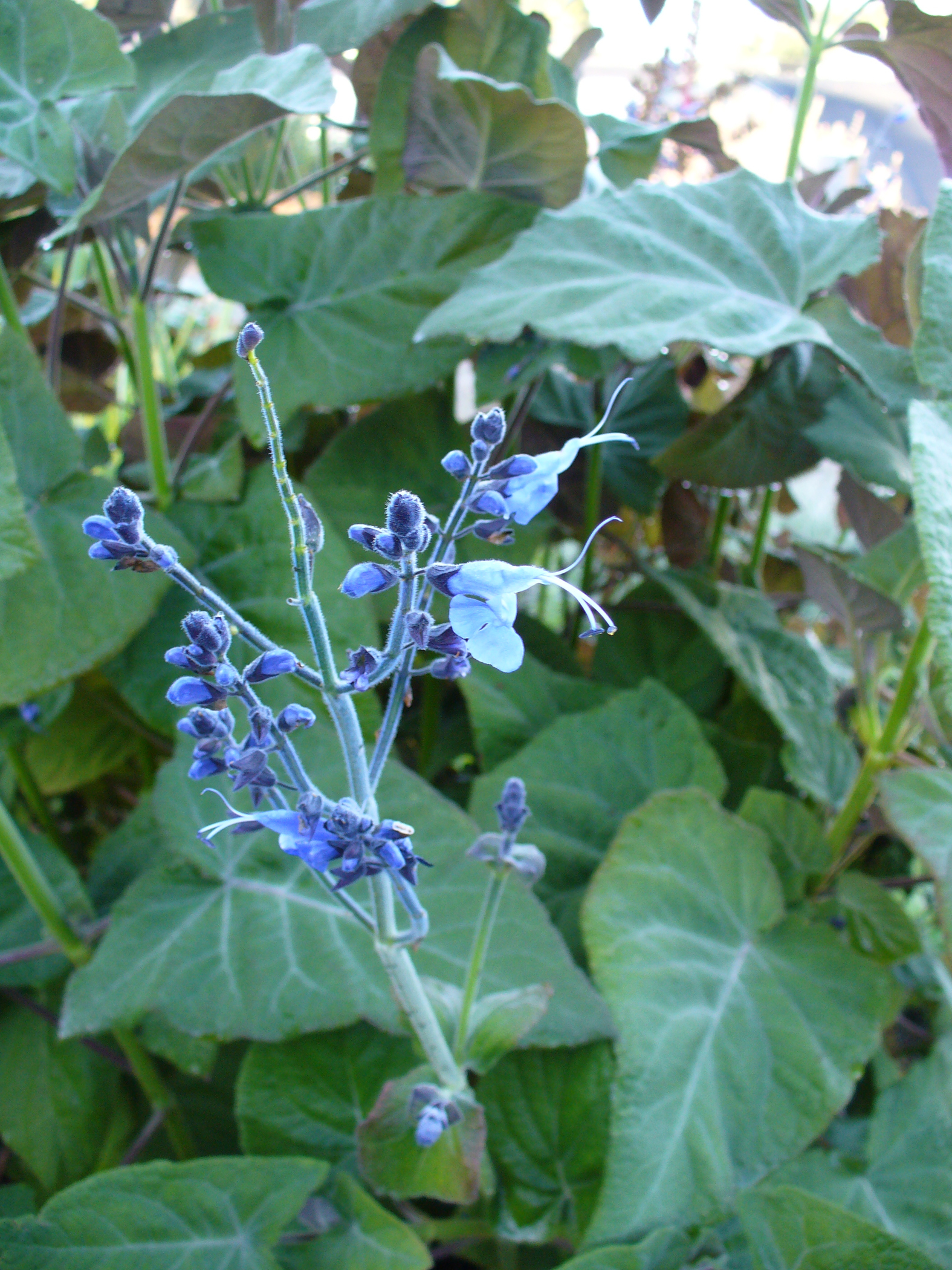

Scientific classification
- Kingdom: Plantae
- Clade: Tracheophytes
- Clade: Angiosperms
- Clade: Eudicots
- Clade: Asterids
- Order: Lamiales
- Family: Lamiaceae
- Genus: Salvia
- Species: S. macrophylla

Binomial name
- Salvia macrophylla Benth.

= Salvia macrophylla =

Species of shrub

Salvia macrophylla is a perennial undershrub native to Colombia, Peru, and Bolivia. In Colombia it is a rare plant, found growing on roadside banks in the south, at elevations from 1,400 to 2,400 m (4,600 to 7,900 ft).

The plant has many decumbent and upright stems reaching 1 m (3.3 ft) high and spreading into a large bush. The triangular-hastate leaves are 10 to 20 cm (3.9 to 7.9 in) long and 8 to 15 cm (3.1 to 5.9 in) wide, and violet on the underside. The leaves have many glands, and are sticky and aromatic. The corolla is blue, 2.5 cm (0.98 in) long, with the upper lip smaller than the lower, growing on 15 to 25 cm (5.9 to 9.8 in) branches.
