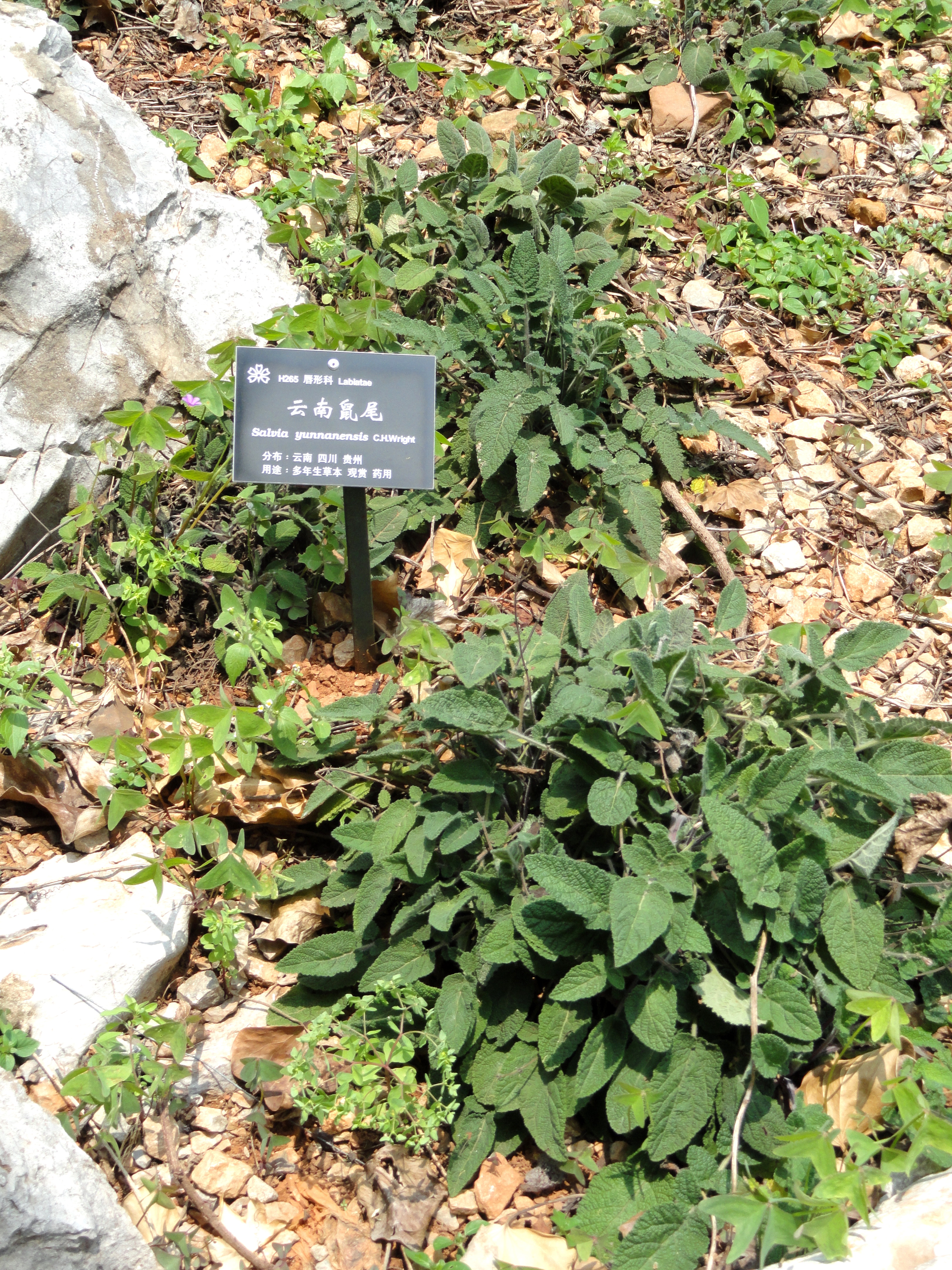

Scientific classification
- Kingdom: Plantae
- Clade: Tracheophytes
- Clade: Angiosperms
- Clade: Eudicots
- Clade: Asterids
- Order: Lamiales
- Family: Lamiaceae
- Genus: Salvia
- Species: S. yunnanensis

Binomial name
- Salvia yunnanensis C. H. Wright

= Salvia yunnanensis =

Species of flowering plant

Salvia yunnanensis is a perennial plant that is native to Yunnan, Guizhou, and Sichuan provinces in China, found growing on grassy hillsides, forest margins, and dry forests at 1,800 to 2,900 m (5,900 to 9,500 ft) elevation. S. yunnanensis has tuberous roots and grows on erect stems to 30 cm (12 in) tall, with simple oblong-elliptic leaves that are 2 to 8 cm (0.79 to 3.15 in) long and 1.5 to 3.5 cm (0.59 to 1.38 in) wide.

Inflorescences are widely spaced 4-6-flowered verticillasters in terminal racemes or panicles, with a 2.5 to 3.0 cm (0.98 to 1.18 in) blue-purple corolla.
