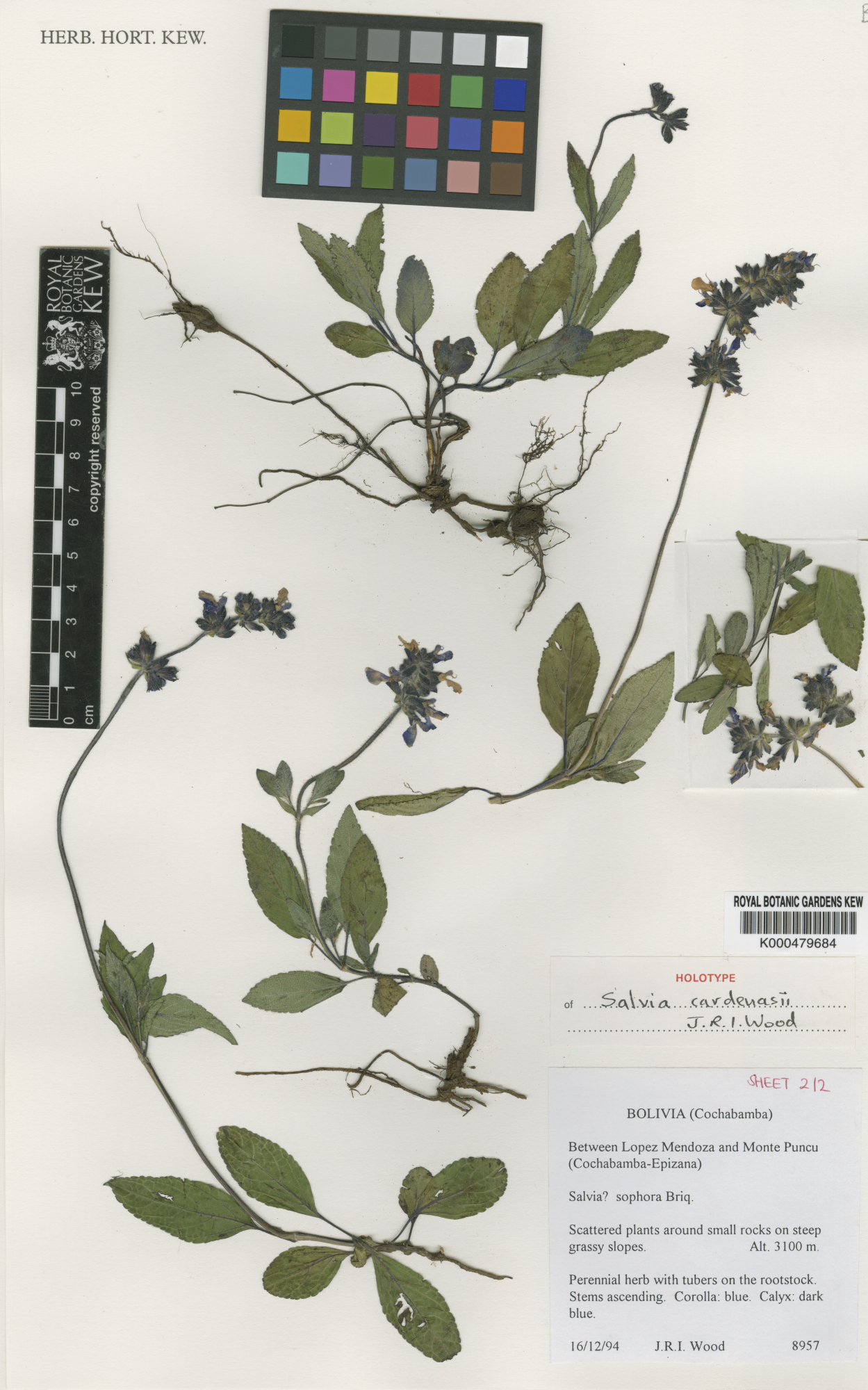

Scientific classification
- Kingdom: Plantae
- Clade: Tracheophytes
- Clade: Angiosperms
- Clade: Eudicots
- Clade: Asterids
- Order: Lamiales
- Family: Lamiaceae
- Genus: Salvia
- Species: S. cardenasii

Binomial name
- Salvia cardenasii J. R. I. Wood

= Salvia cardenasii =

Species of herb

Salvia cardenasii is a rare and endangered perennial herb that is endemic to Bolivia, found in only three small populations, making it vulnerable to grazing animals and other damage. It grows on grassy slopes near rock outcrops, at approximately 3,000 metres (9,800 ft) elevation.

S. cardenasii grows on dark violet to greenish stems that first lie on the ground, and then grow upright to 8 to 25 centimetres (0.26 to 0.82 ft) long. Leaves are oblong to narrowly elliptic, 2.7 to 6.5 cm (1.1 to 2.6 in) by .5 to 1.7 cm (0.20 to 0.67 in). The inflorescence is simple terminal racemes with 1–4 verticillasters, with a blue corolla that is 8 to 9 mm (0.31 to 0.35 in).
