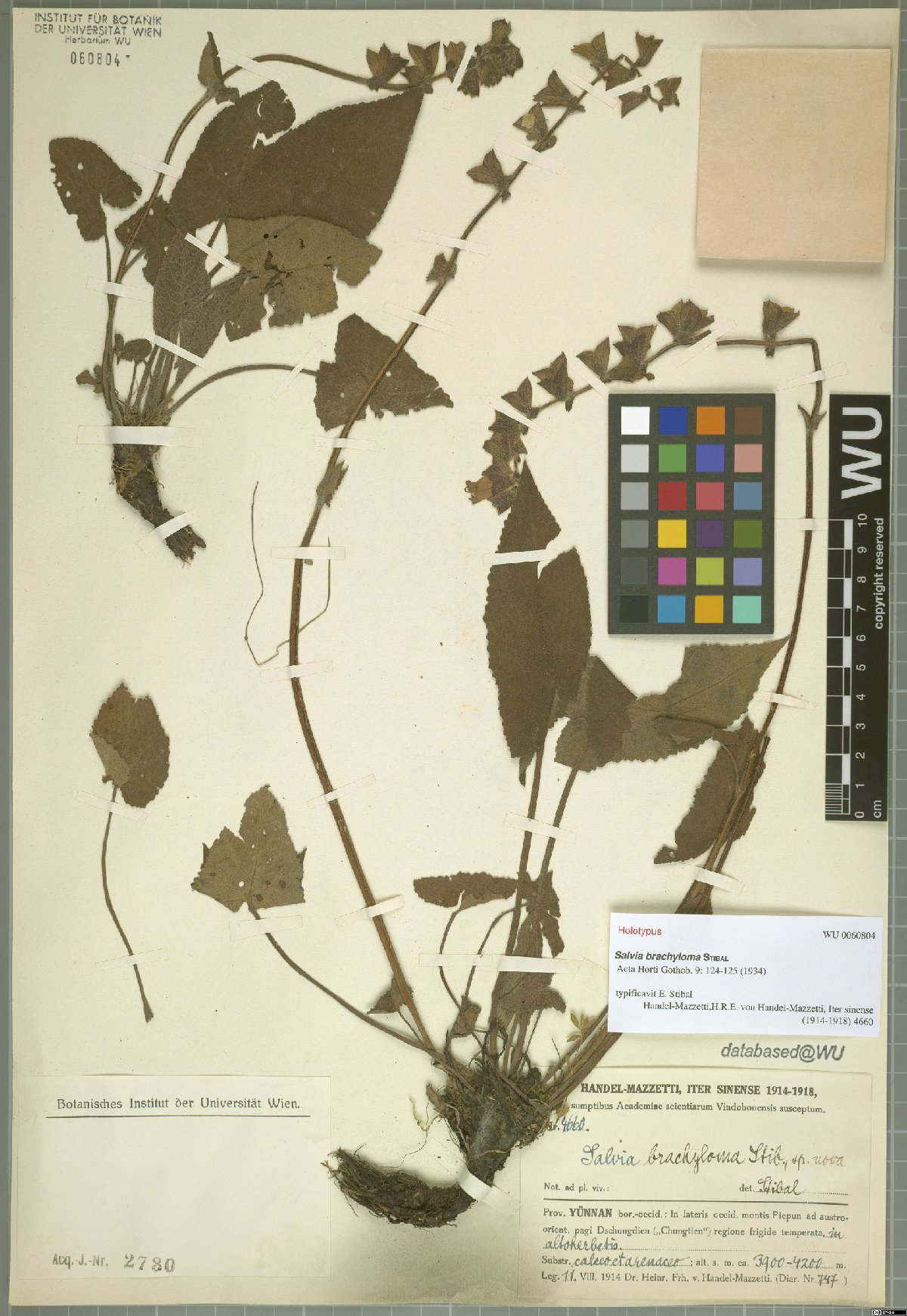

Scientific classification
- Kingdom: Plantae
- Clade: Tracheophytes
- Clade: Angiosperms
- Clade: Eudicots
- Clade: Asterids
- Order: Lamiales
- Family: Lamiaceae
- Genus: Salvia
- Species: S. brachyloma

Binomial name
- Salvia brachyloma E. Peter

= Salvia brachyloma =

Species of flowering plant

Salvia brachyloma is a perennial plant that is native to Yunnan and Sichuan provinces in China, growing on grassy slopes and forested grasslands at 3,200 to 3,800 m (10,500 to 12,500 ft) elevation. The plant grows on one to a few stems from 20 to 57 cm (7.9 to 22.4 in) tall. The leaves are hastate to narrowly ovate, ranging in size from 3.5 to 11 cm (1.4 to 4.3 in) long and 2 to 5 cm (0.79 to 1.97 in) wide.

Inflorescences are widely spaced 2-flowered verticillasters on terminal racemes or panicles that grow up to 15 cm (5.9 in) long. The corolla is purplish, 2 to 2.3 cm (0.79 to 0.91 in) long.
