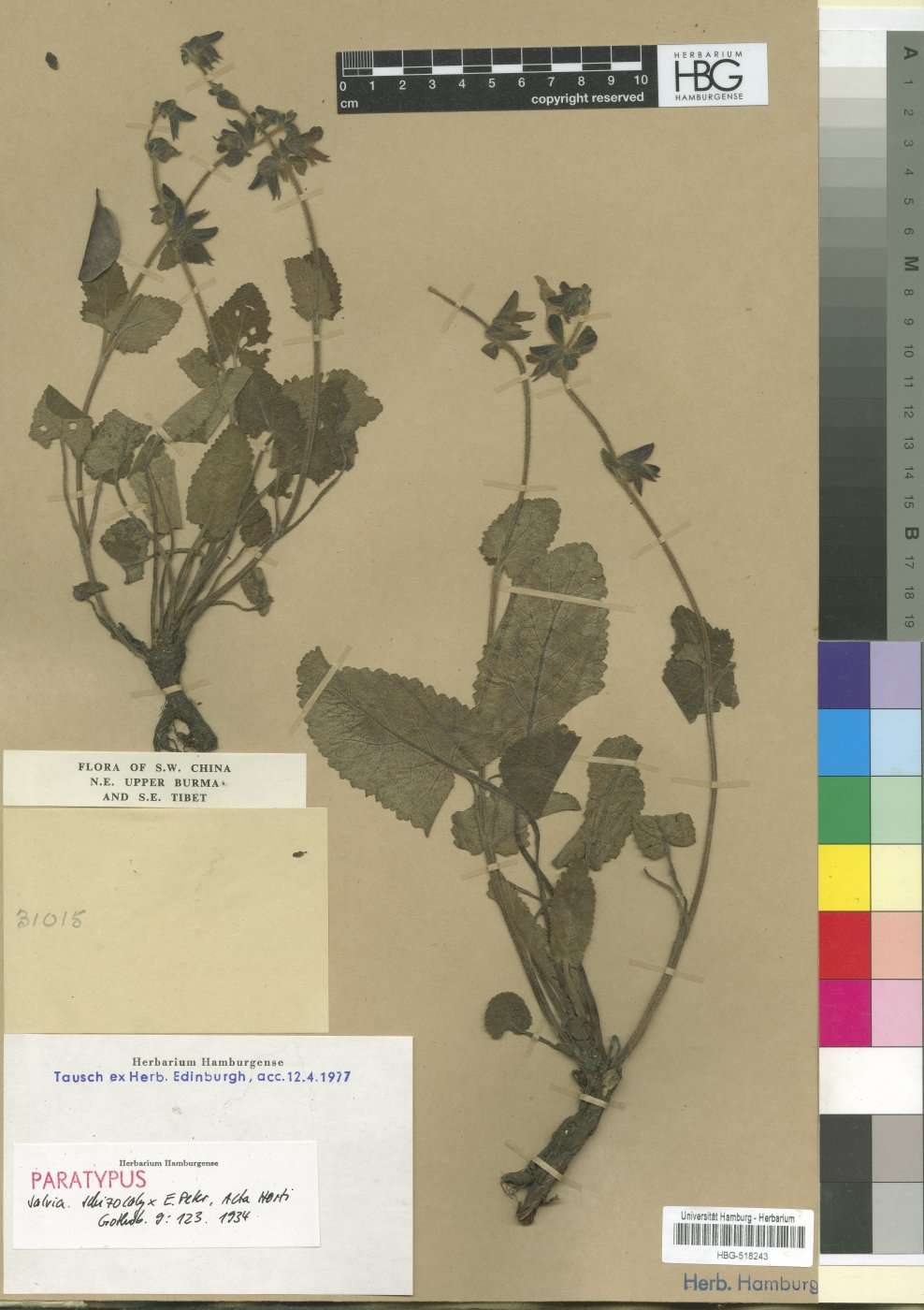

Scientific classification
- Kingdom: Plantae
- Clade: Tracheophytes
- Clade: Angiosperms
- Clade: Eudicots
- Clade: Asterids
- Order: Lamiales
- Family: Lamiaceae
- Genus: Salvia
- Species: S. schizocalyx

Binomial name
- Salvia schizocalyx E. Peter

= Salvia schizocalyx =

Species of flowering plant

Salvia schizocalyx (the Burmese cleft sage) is a perennial plant that is native to Yunnan province in China, growing at 4,000 m (13,000 ft) elevation. The plant grows on one to a few unbranched upright stems with widely spaced leaves, reaching approximately 45 cm (18 in) tall. The leaves are broadly ovate to narrowly triangular-ovate, and rarely oblong-ovate, typically ranging in size from 2 to 5 cm (0.79 to 1.97 in) long and 1.2 to 4.5 cm (0.47 to 1.77 in) wide, though they can grow larger.

Inflorescences are 2–4-flowered verticillasters on terminal racemes, with a blue or violet corolla that is 2 to 2.5 cm (0.79 to 0.98 in) long.
