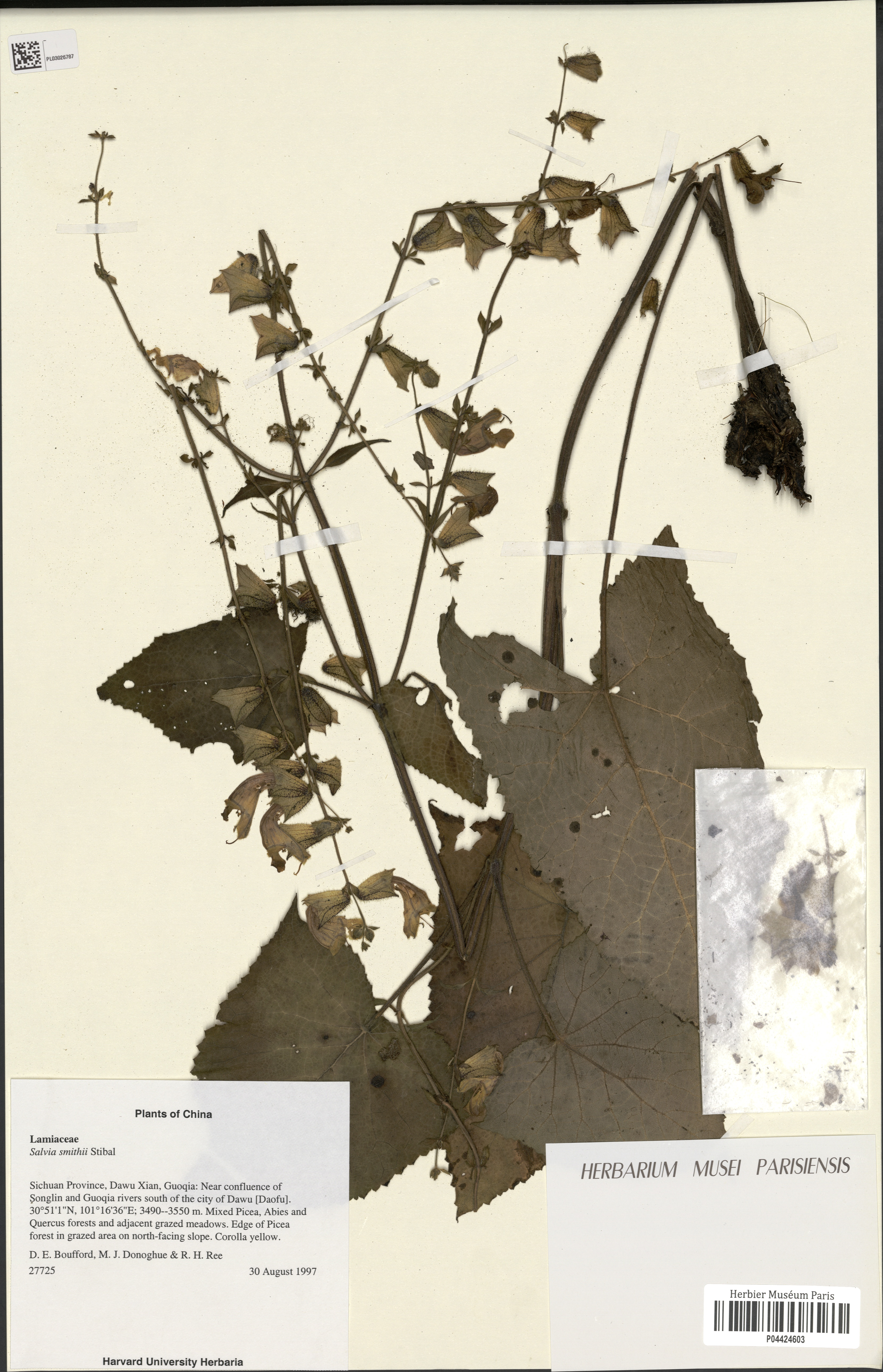

Scientific classification
- Kingdom: Plantae
- Clade: Tracheophytes
- Clade: Angiosperms
- Clade: Eudicots
- Clade: Asterids
- Order: Lamiales
- Family: Lamiaceae
- Genus: Salvia
- Species: S. smithii

Binomial name
- Salvia smithii E. Peter

= Salvia smithii =

Species of flowering plant

Salvia smithii (the Sichuan orange sage) is an aromatic perennial plant that is native to Sichuan province in China, found growing on riverbanks, valleys, and hillsides at 2,600 to 3,500 m (8,500 to 11,500 ft) elevation. S. smithii grows to 30 to 90 cm (12 to 35 in) tall, with leaves that are broadly cordate-ovate to ovate-hastate, ranging in size from 4 to 22 cm (1.6 to 8.7 in) long and 3 to 18 cm (1.2 to 7.1 in) wide.

Inflorescences are 2-flowered verticillasters in loose many branched raceme-panicles. The plant has a yellow corolla that is 4 to 4.5 cm (1.6 to 1.8 in).
