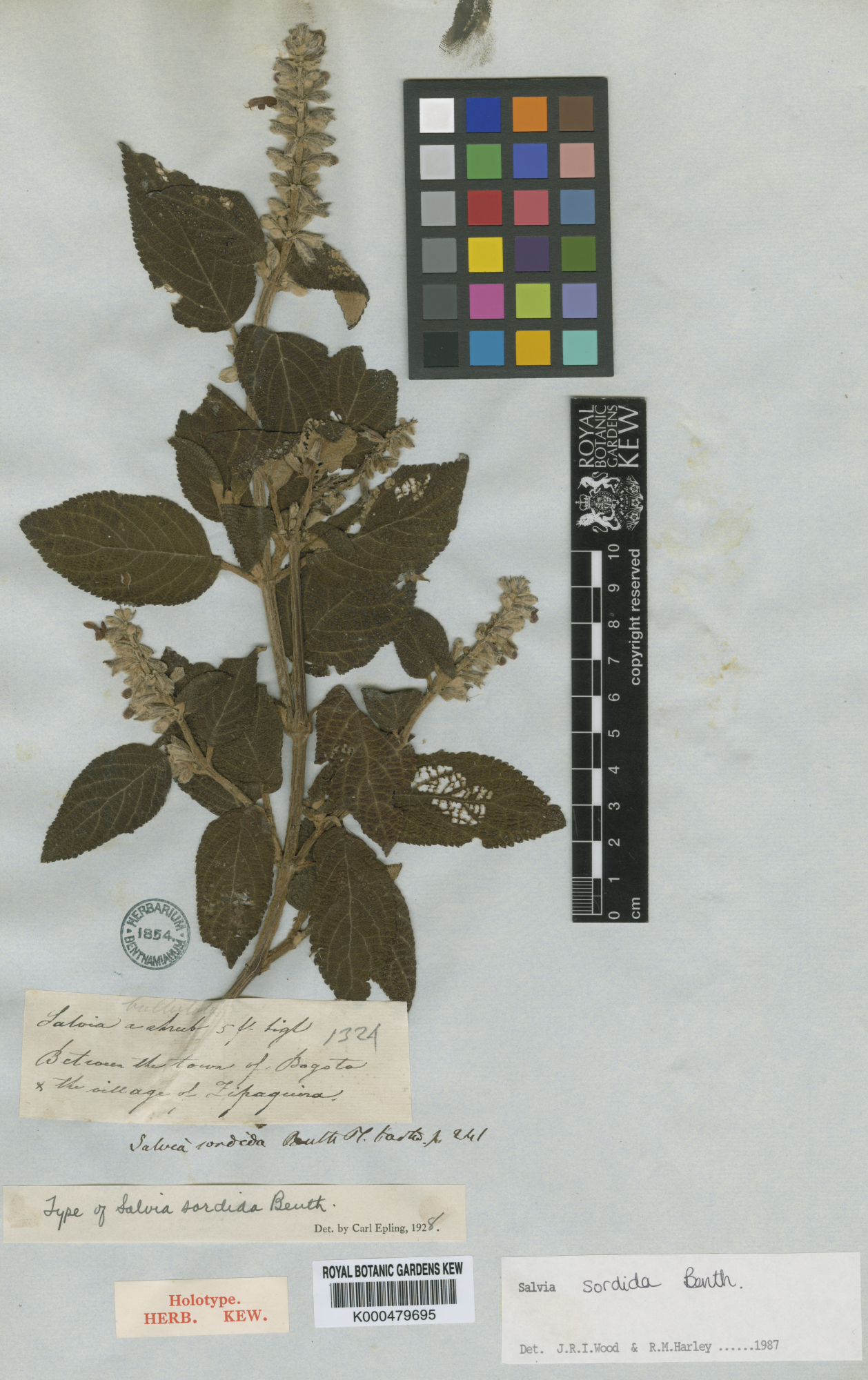

Scientific classification
- Kingdom: Plantae
- Clade: Tracheophytes
- Clade: Angiosperms
- Clade: Eudicots
- Clade: Asterids
- Order: Lamiales
- Family: Lamiaceae
- Genus: Salvia
- Species: S. sordida

Binomial name
- Salvia sordida Benth.

= Salvia sordida =

Species of shrub

Salvia sordida is a rare perennial shrub endemic to a very small area in Colombia, along an old road from Bogota to La Caro, growing at 2,600 m (8,500 ft) elevation in scrub next to streams.

The plant reaches up to 2 m (6.6 ft) tall, with the entire plant whitish-green in color. The ovate leaves are small—4 to 6 cm (1.6 to 2.4 in) long and 2 to 3.5 cm (0.79 to 1.38 in) wide—and grey tomentose underneath. The inflorescence has short, dense, terminal racemes, with a 16 mm (0.63 in) purple corolla. Flowers also grow in the axils of the upper leaves. It is the most threatened of all Colombia species in the family Labiatae deemed as Critically Endangered by the National University of Colombia.
