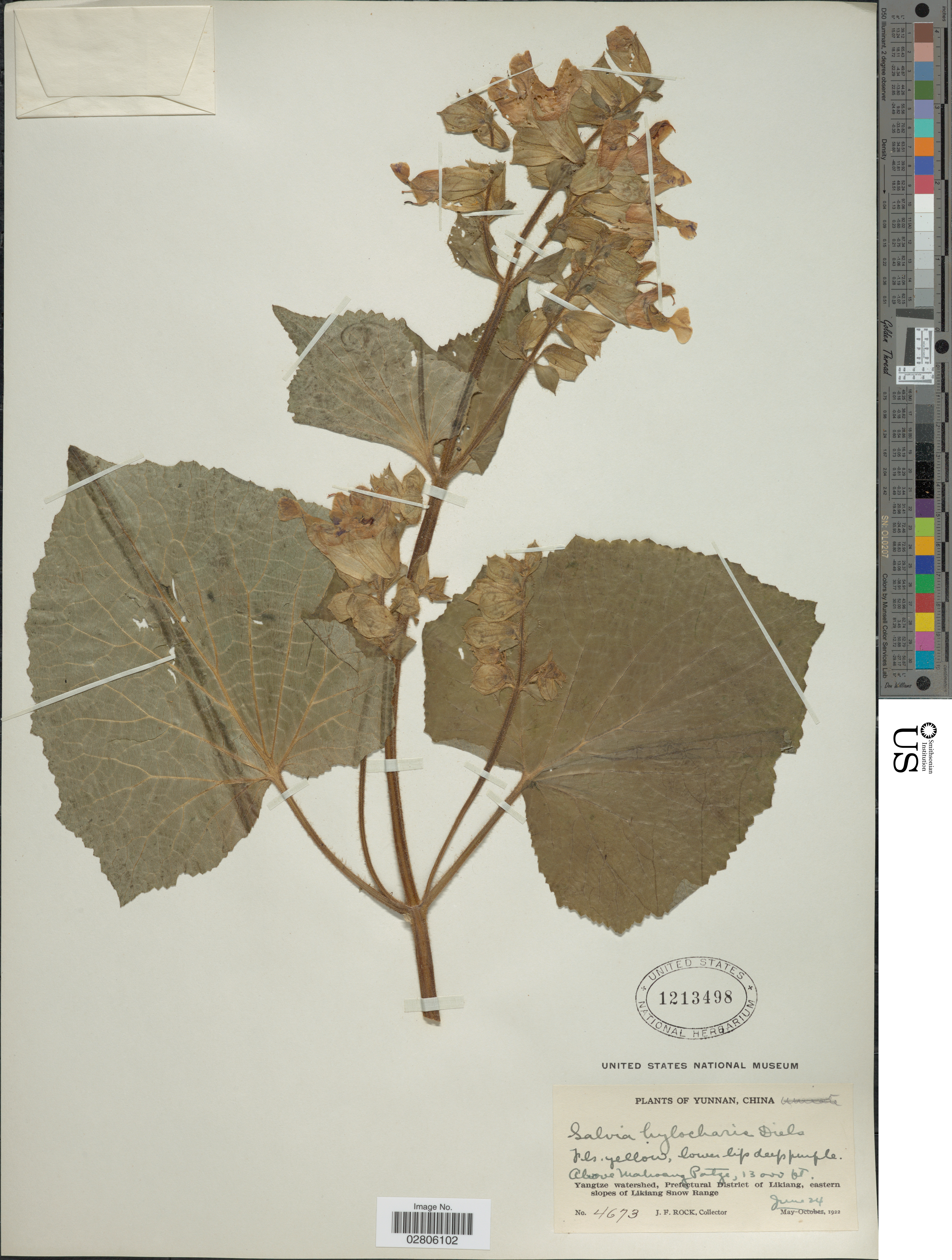

Scientific classification
- Kingdom: Plantae
- Clade: Tracheophytes
- Clade: Angiosperms
- Clade: Eudicots
- Clade: Asterids
- Order: Lamiales
- Family: Lamiaceae
- Genus: Salvia
- Species: S. hylocharis

Binomial name
- Salvia hylocharis Diels

= Salvia hylocharis =

Species of flowering plant

Salvia hylocharis is a perennial plant that is native to Xizang and Yunnan provinces in China, growing on grassy slopes, forest margins, and streamsides at 2,800 to 4,000 m (9,200 to 13,100 ft) elevation. S. hylocharis grows on one or two ascending to erect stems to 45 to 90 cm (18 to 35 in) tall. The leaves are ovate-triangular to ovate-hastate, typically ranging in size from 3 to 8.5 cm (1.2 to 3.3 in) long and approximately 8.5 cm (3.3 in) wide, though they sometimes are larger.

Inflorescences are racemes or raceme-panicles up to 25 cm (9.8 in), with a yellow corolla that is 3.5 to 3.8 cm (1.4 to 1.5 in), occasionally smaller.
