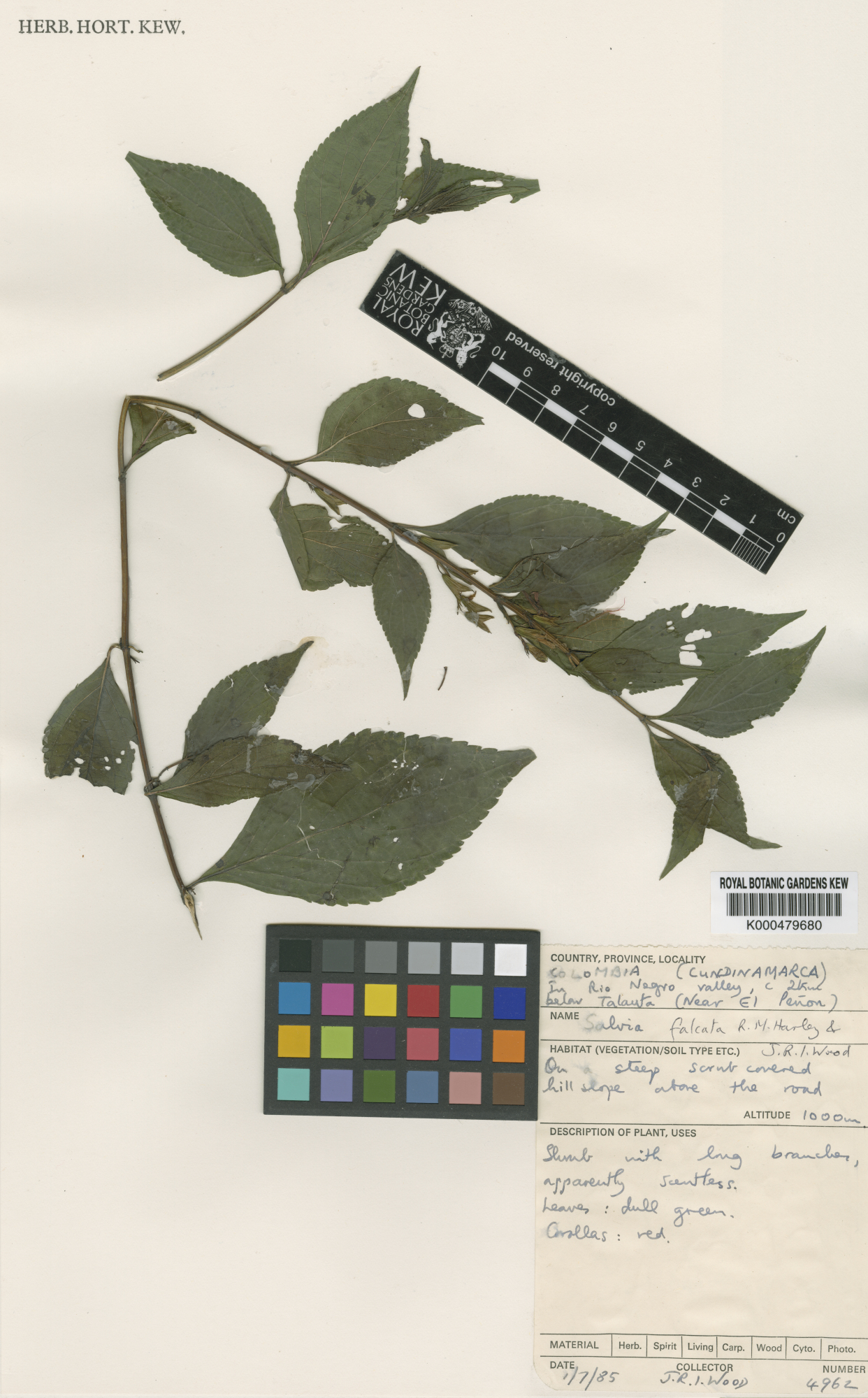

Scientific classification
- Kingdom: Plantae
- Clade: Tracheophytes
- Clade: Angiosperms
- Clade: Eudicots
- Clade: Asterids
- Order: Lamiales
- Family: Lamiaceae
- Genus: Salvia
- Species: S. falcata

Binomial name
- Salvia falcata J.R.I. Wood & Harley

= Salvia falcata =

Species of shrub

Salvia falcata is a perennial shrub that is endemic to a very small area in NW Cundinamarca in Colombia, growing in dry bushland in a steep river valley at around 1,000 m (3,300 ft) elevation—unusually low for red-flowered salvias.

Salvia falcata grows to 2 m (6.6 ft) tall, with 4-angle stems, and with many branches. The leaves are lanceolate-elliptic to ovate-ellipitic, ranging from 6 to 11 cm (2.4 to 4.3 in) long and 1.8 to 4.7 cm (0.71 to 1.85 in) wide. The inflorescence has single racemes in the leaf axils with a 2.6 to 2.8 cm (1.0 to 1.1 in) red corolla.
