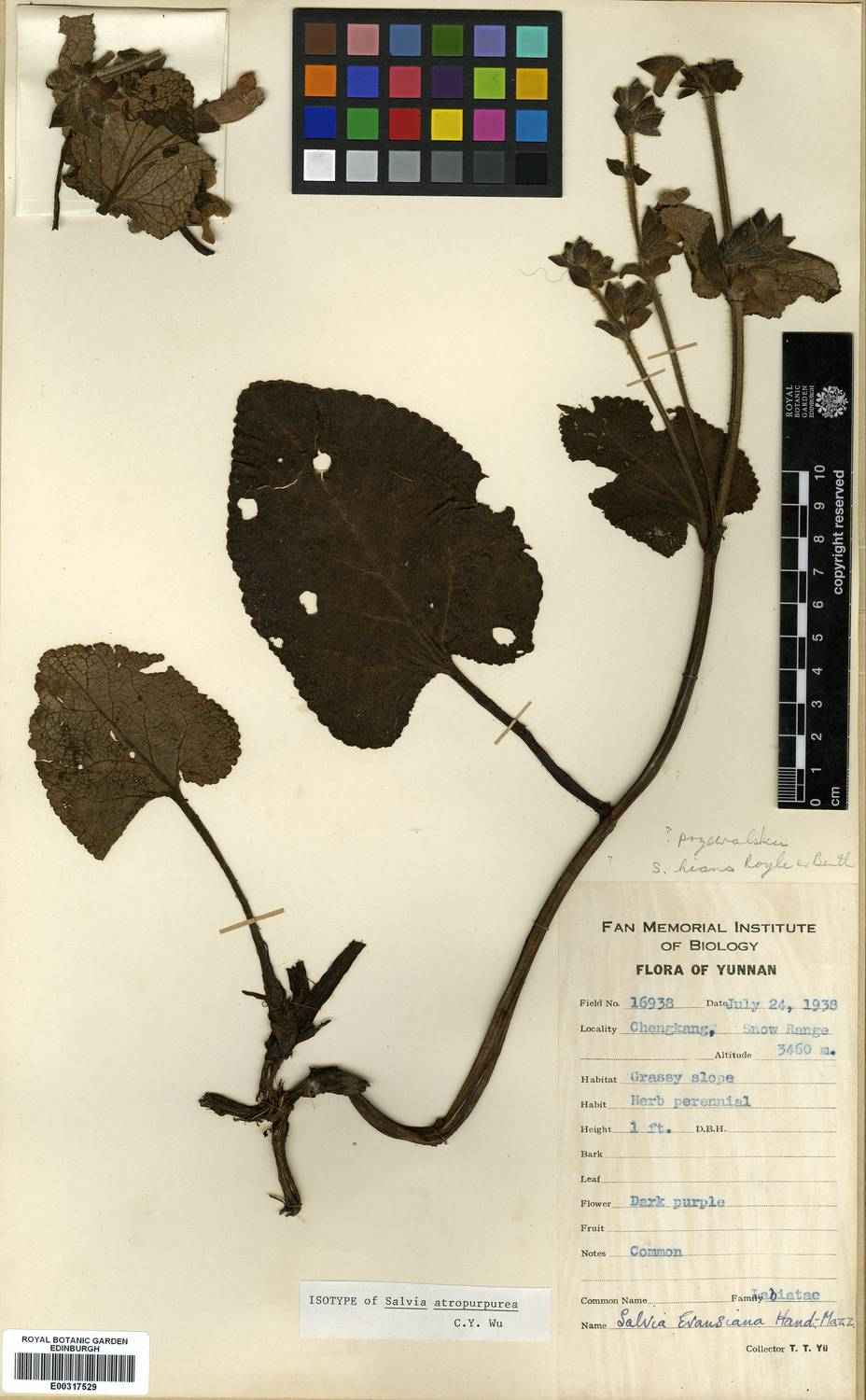

Scientific classification
- Kingdom: Plantae
- Clade: Tracheophytes
- Clade: Angiosperms
- Clade: Eudicots
- Clade: Asterids
- Order: Lamiales
- Family: Lamiaceae
- Genus: Salvia
- Species: S. atropurpurea

Binomial name
- Salvia atropurpurea C. Y. Wu

= Salvia atropurpurea =

Species of flowering plant

Salvia atropurpurea is a perennial plant that is native to Yunnan province in China, growing on grassy slopes at 3,400 m (11,200 ft) elevation. S. atropurpurea grows on one erect stem to 50 cm (20 in) tall. The leaves are ovate to broadly ovate, ranging in size from 3.5 to 10.5 cm (1.4 to 4.1 in) long and approximately 2.5 to 9 cm (0.98 to 3.54 in) wide.

Inflorescences are 2–6 flowered verticillasters in terminal racemes or panicles 6 to 15 cm (2.4 to 5.9 in), with a dark purple corolla that is 2.5 to 3 cm (0.98 to 1.18 in).
