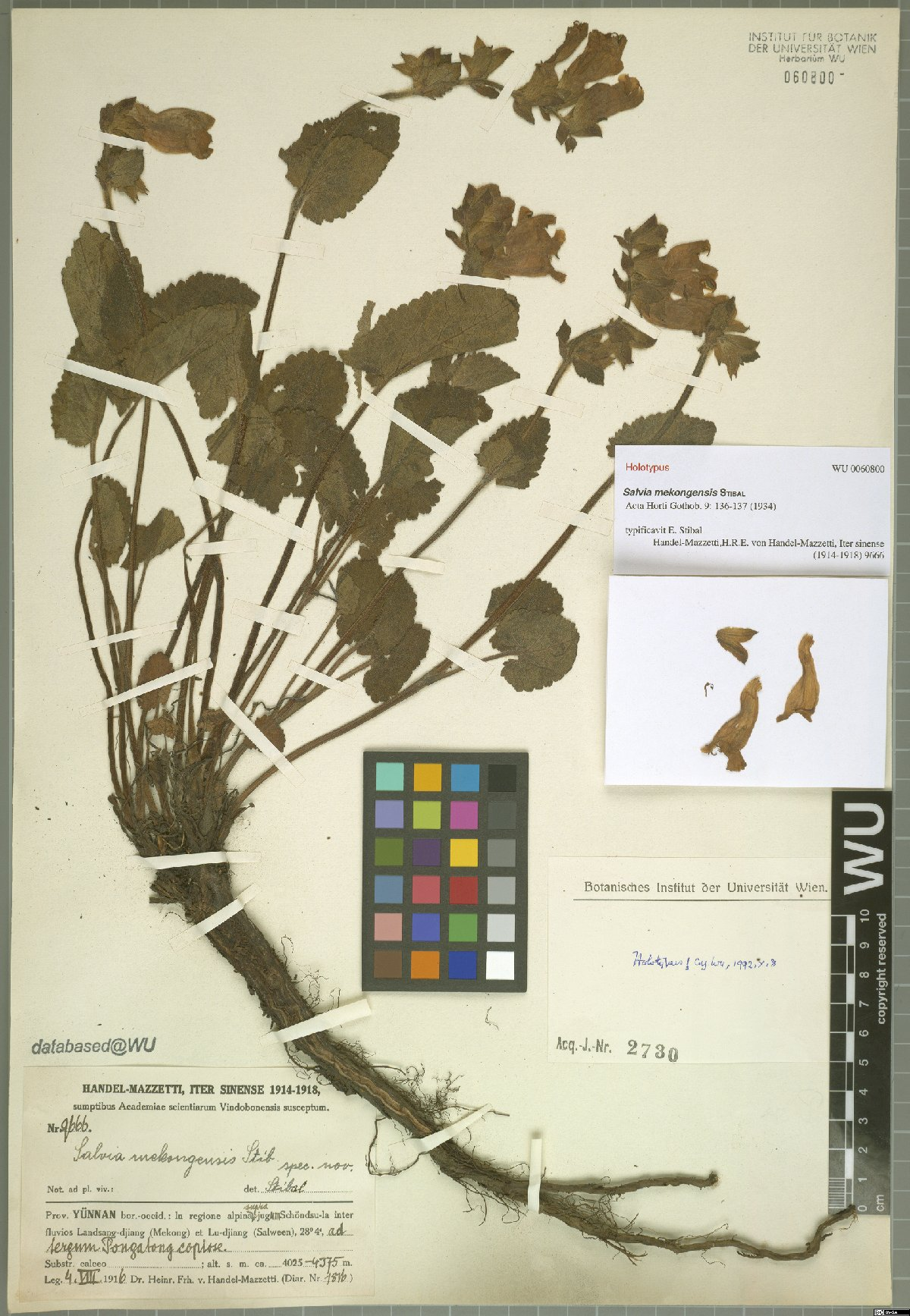

Scientific classification
- Kingdom: Plantae
- Clade: Tracheophytes
- Clade: Angiosperms
- Clade: Eudicots
- Clade: Asterids
- Order: Lamiales
- Family: Lamiaceae
- Genus: Salvia
- Species: S. mekongensis

Binomial name
- Salvia mekongensis E. Peter

= Salvia mekongensis =

Species of flowering plant

Salvia mekongensis (Mekong sage) is a perennial plant native to Yunnan province in China, found growing on hilly grasslands at 2,800 to 4,100 m (9,200 to 13,500 ft) elevation. S. mekongensis grows on one to five ascending to erect stems, with mostly basal leaves that are usually ovate to oblong-ovate, 3 to 9 cm (1.2 to 3.5 in) long and 2 to 8 cm (0.79 to 3.15 in) wide.

Inflorescences are 2 flowered verticillasters in terminal racemes or panicles, 6 to 10 cm (2.4 to 3.9 in) long. The corolla is yellow and 3.5 to 4 cm (1.4 to 1.6 in).
