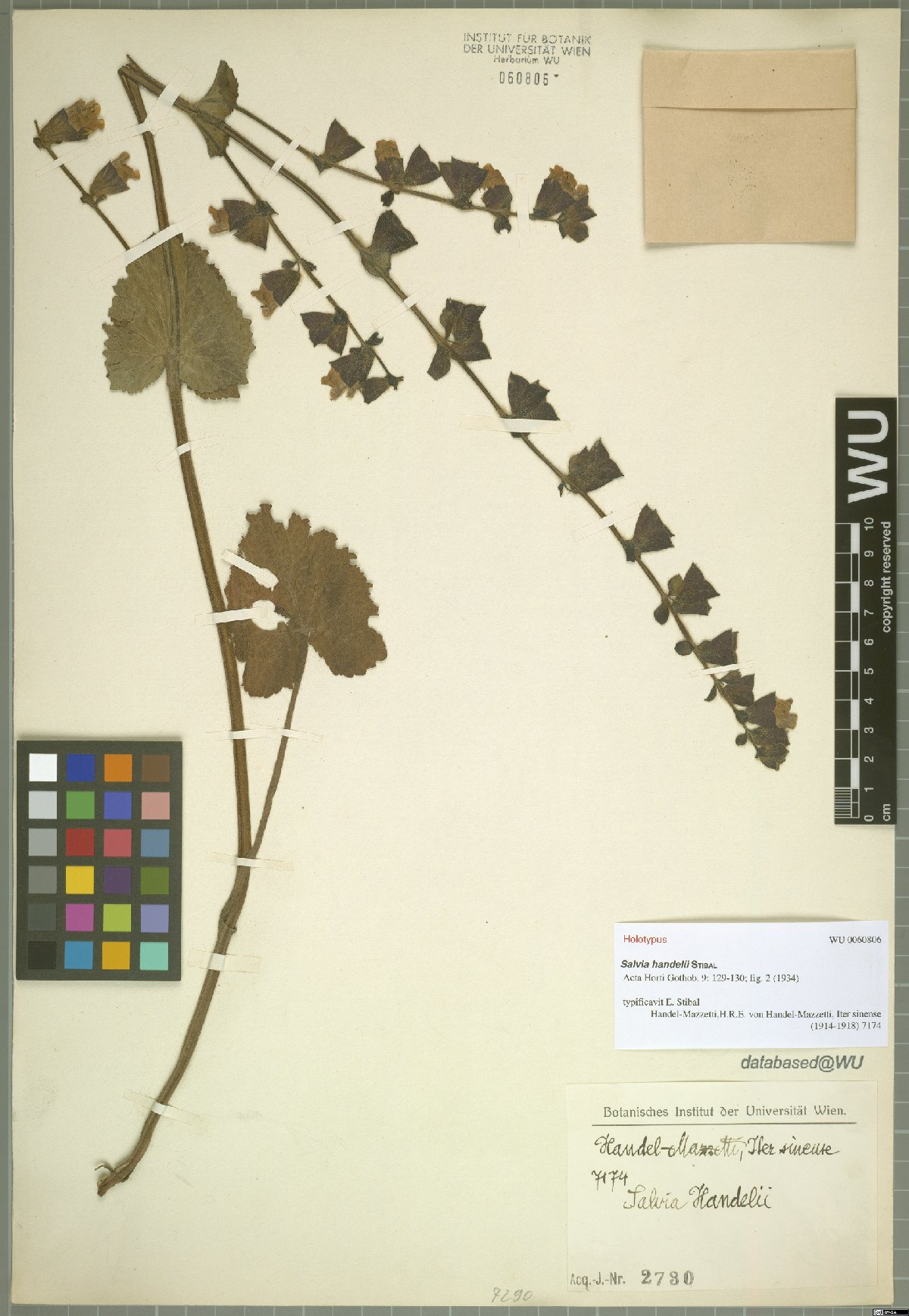

Scientific classification
- Kingdom: Plantae
- Clade: Tracheophytes
- Clade: Angiosperms
- Clade: Eudicots
- Clade: Asterids
- Order: Lamiales
- Family: Lamiaceae
- Genus: Salvia
- Species: S. handelii

Binomial name
- Salvia handelii E. Peter

= Salvia handelii =

Species of flowering plant

Salvia handelii is a perennial plant that is native to Sichuan province in China, growing on grassy slopes on limestone mountains at 3,800 to 3,900 m (12,500 to 12,800 ft) elevation. S. handelii grows on one or two ascending stems to 50 to 80 cm (20 to 31 in) tall. The leaves are broadly ovate-triangular to subcircular, ranging in size from 8 to 19 cm (3.1 to 7.5 in) long and 4 to 19 cm (1.6 to 7.5 in) wide. Inflorescences are in terminal racemes or raceme-panicles up to 25 cm (9.8 in), with a green-white corolla with violet spots that is 1.8 to 2.2 cm (0.71 to 0.87 in).
