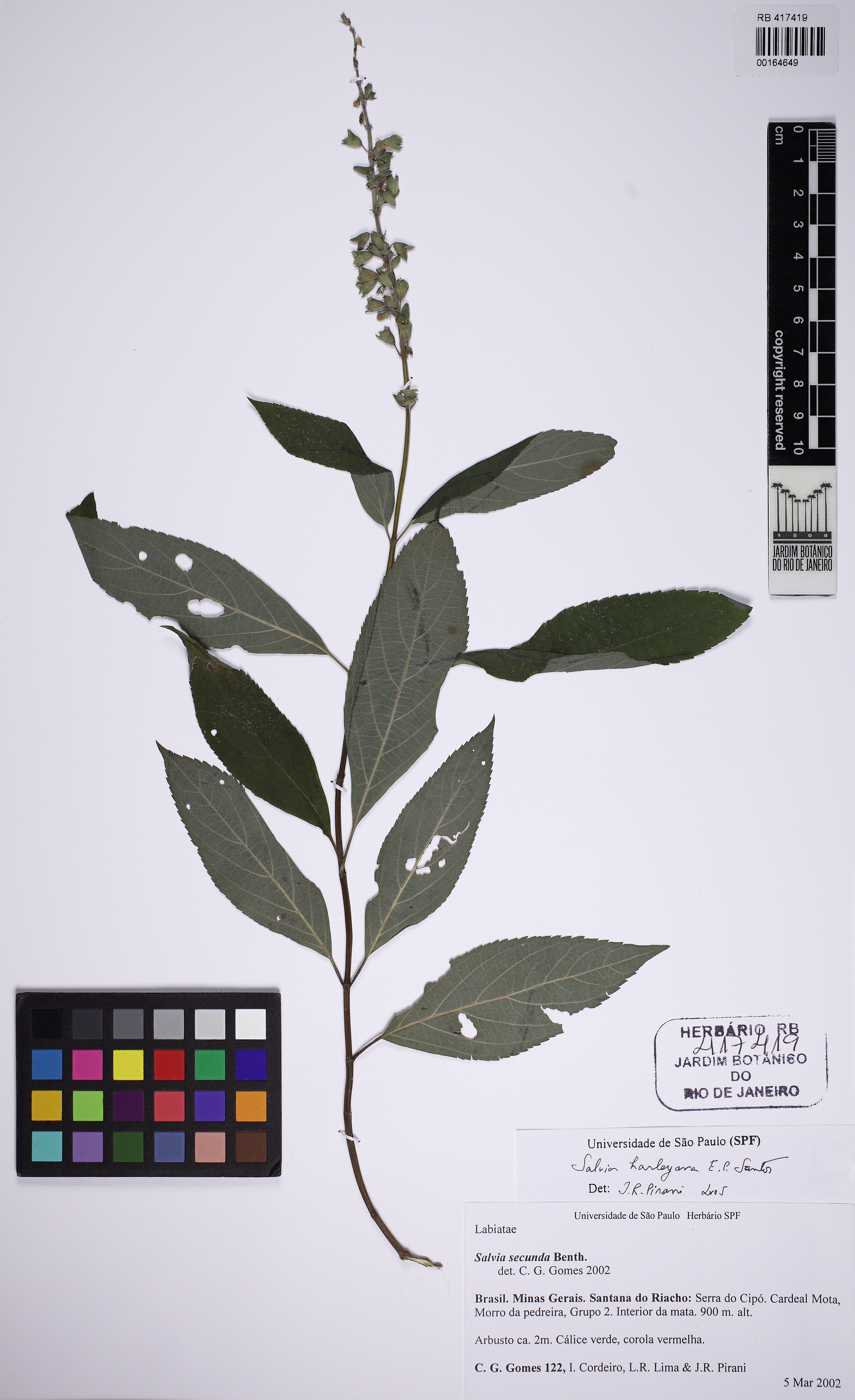

Scientific classification
- Kingdom: Plantae
- Clade: Tracheophytes
- Clade: Angiosperms
- Clade: Eudicots
- Clade: Asterids
- Order: Lamiales
- Family: Lamiaceae
- Genus: Salvia
- Species: S. harleyana

Binomial name
- Salvia harleyana E.P.Santos

= Salvia harleyana =

Species of shrub

Salvia harleyana is a subshrub that is endemic to the Serra do Cipó area in Minas Gerais state in Brazil. It grows in savanna and gallery forest at approximately 1,000 metres (3,300 ft) elevation.

S. harleyana grows on erect stems, reaching 1 to 2 metres (3.3 to 6.6 ft) tall, with petiolate leaves that are 1.5 to 3 cm (0.59 to 1.18 in) long. The terminal inflorescence is 15 to 30 cm (5.9 to 11.8 in) long, with a red corolla that is 7.5 to 9 mm (0.30 to 0.35 in). The specific epithet honors botanist Raymond Harley, Royal Botanic Gardens, Kew.
