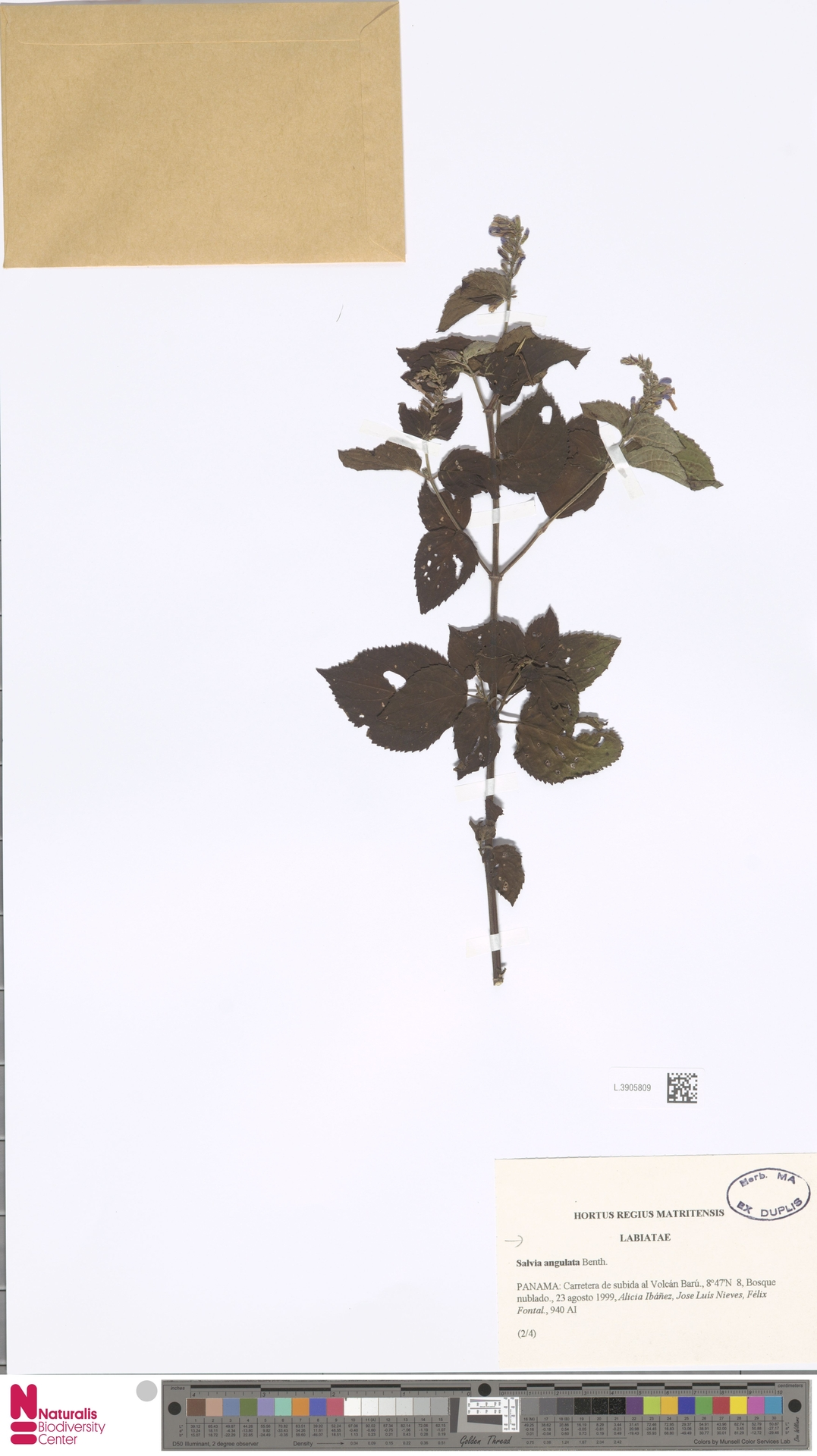

Scientific classification
- Kingdom: Plantae
- Clade: Tracheophytes
- Clade: Angiosperms
- Clade: Eudicots
- Clade: Asterids
- Order: Lamiales
- Family: Lamiaceae
- Genus: Salvia
- Species: S. angulata

Binomial name
- Salvia angulata Benth.

Synonyms
- S. longimarginata Briq. S. tovarienis Briq. S. tenuistachya Rusby

= Salvia angulata =

Species of flowering plant

Salvia angulata is a herbaceous perennial native to the Caribbean coast from Panama through Colombia to Venezuela. It grows on the sides of streams and in wet forests, at 450 to 1,500 m (1,480 to 4,920 ft) elevation.

S. angulata reaches 1 m (3.3 ft) high, with ovate or subrhomboid leaves. The inflorescence of terminal racemes is 8 to 15 cm (3.1 to 5.9 in) long, with 10–15 verticillasters. The 10 mm (0.39 in) corolla is white, or white tinged with blue.
