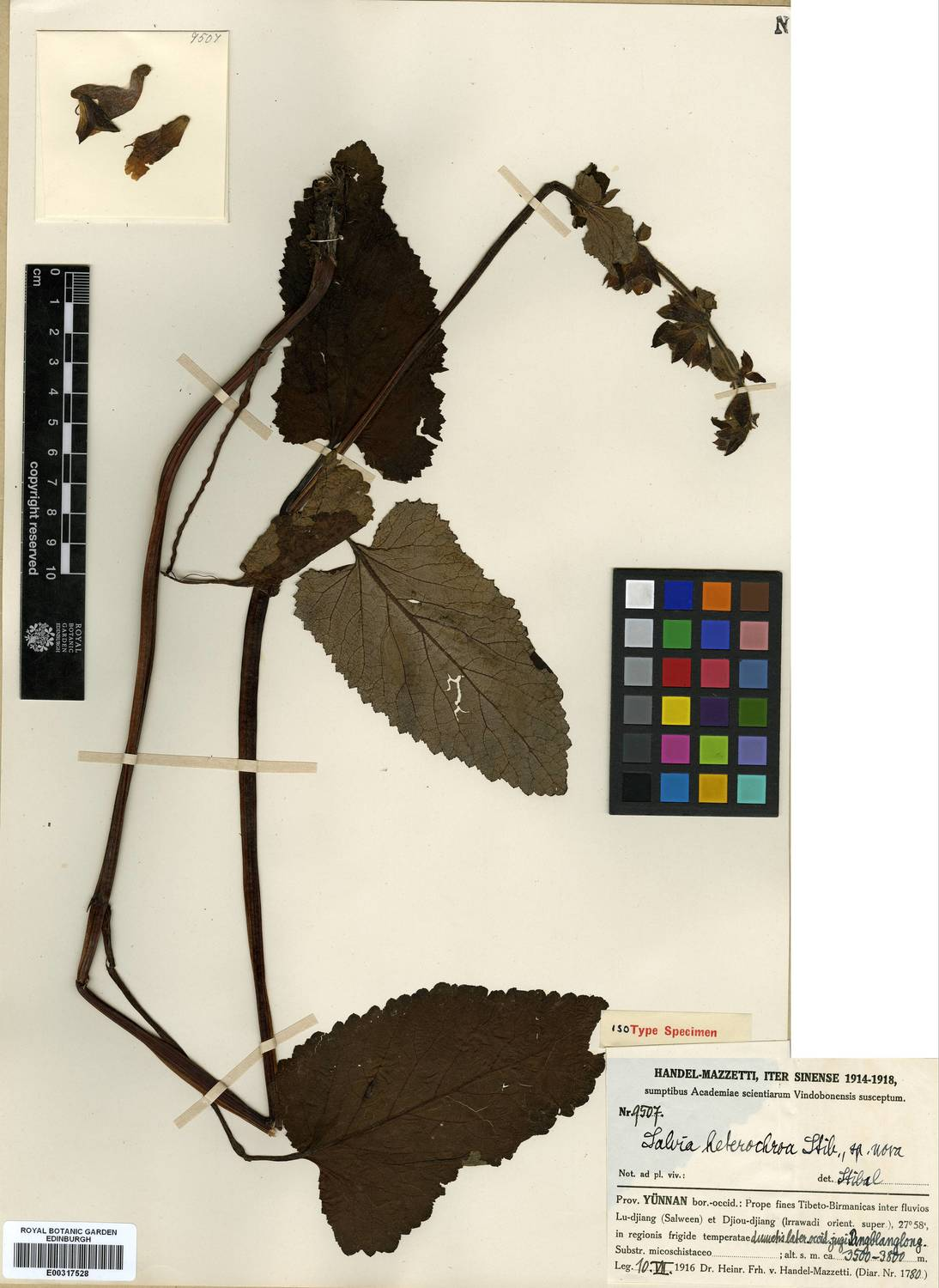

Scientific classification
- Kingdom: Plantae
- Clade: Tracheophytes
- Clade: Angiosperms
- Clade: Eudicots
- Clade: Asterids
- Order: Lamiales
- Family: Lamiaceae
- Genus: Salvia
- Species: S. heterochroa

Binomial name
- Salvia heterochroa E. Peter

= Salvia heterochroa =

Species of flowering plant

Salvia heterochroa is a perennial plant that is native to Yunnan province in China, found growing on grassy slopes at 3,500 to 3,800 m (11,500 to 12,500 ft) elevation. S. heterochroa grows on one or two stems, with elliptic-ovate leaves that range in size from 4 to 13 cm (1.6 to 5.1 in) long and 2.5 to 10 cm (0.98 to 3.94 in) wide.

Inflorescences are 2-6 flowered widely spaced verticillasters in raceme-panicles. The plant has a dark purple or blue-purple corolla that is 2.5 to 3 cm (0.98 to 1.18 in).
