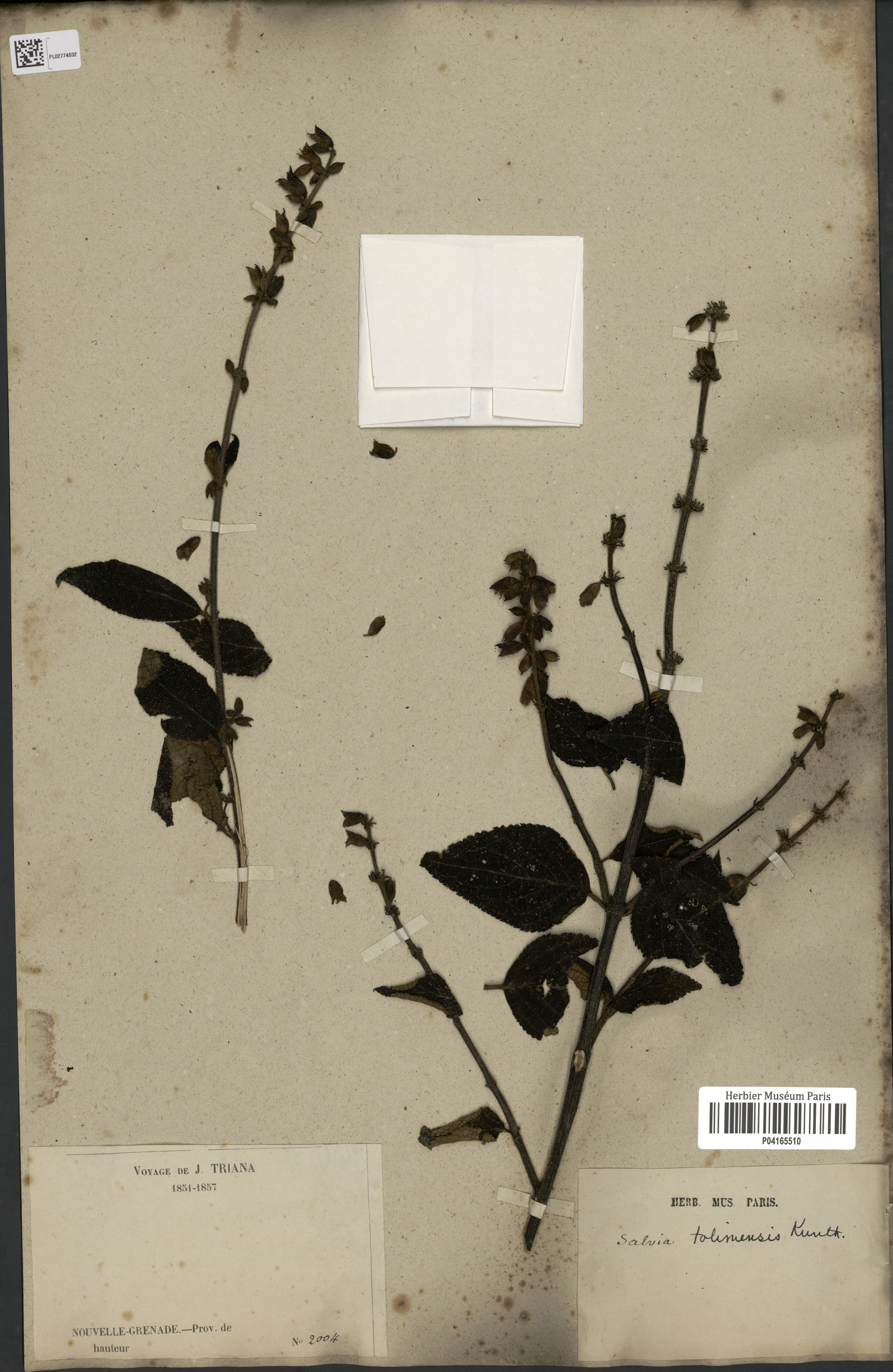

Scientific classification
- Kingdom: Plantae
- Clade: Tracheophytes
- Clade: Angiosperms
- Clade: Eudicots
- Clade: Asterids
- Order: Lamiales
- Family: Lamiaceae
- Genus: Salvia
- Species: S. tolimensis

Binomial name
- Salvia tolimensis Kunth

= Salvia tolimensis =

Species of shrub

Salvia tolimensis is a perennial shrub endemic to a very small region in Colombia (Tolima) growing on streamsides, scrublands, and forest edges in wet conditions at 2,400 to 3,500 m (7,900 to 11,500 ft) elevation. The plant is a vigorous undershrub, about 1 metre (3.3 ft) high, with narrow ovate leaves that are 6 to 10 cm (2.4 to 3.9 in) long and 2.5 to 4 cm (0.98 to 1.57 in) wide. The purple flowers are 2.2 to 2.5 cm (0.87 to 0.98 in) long.
