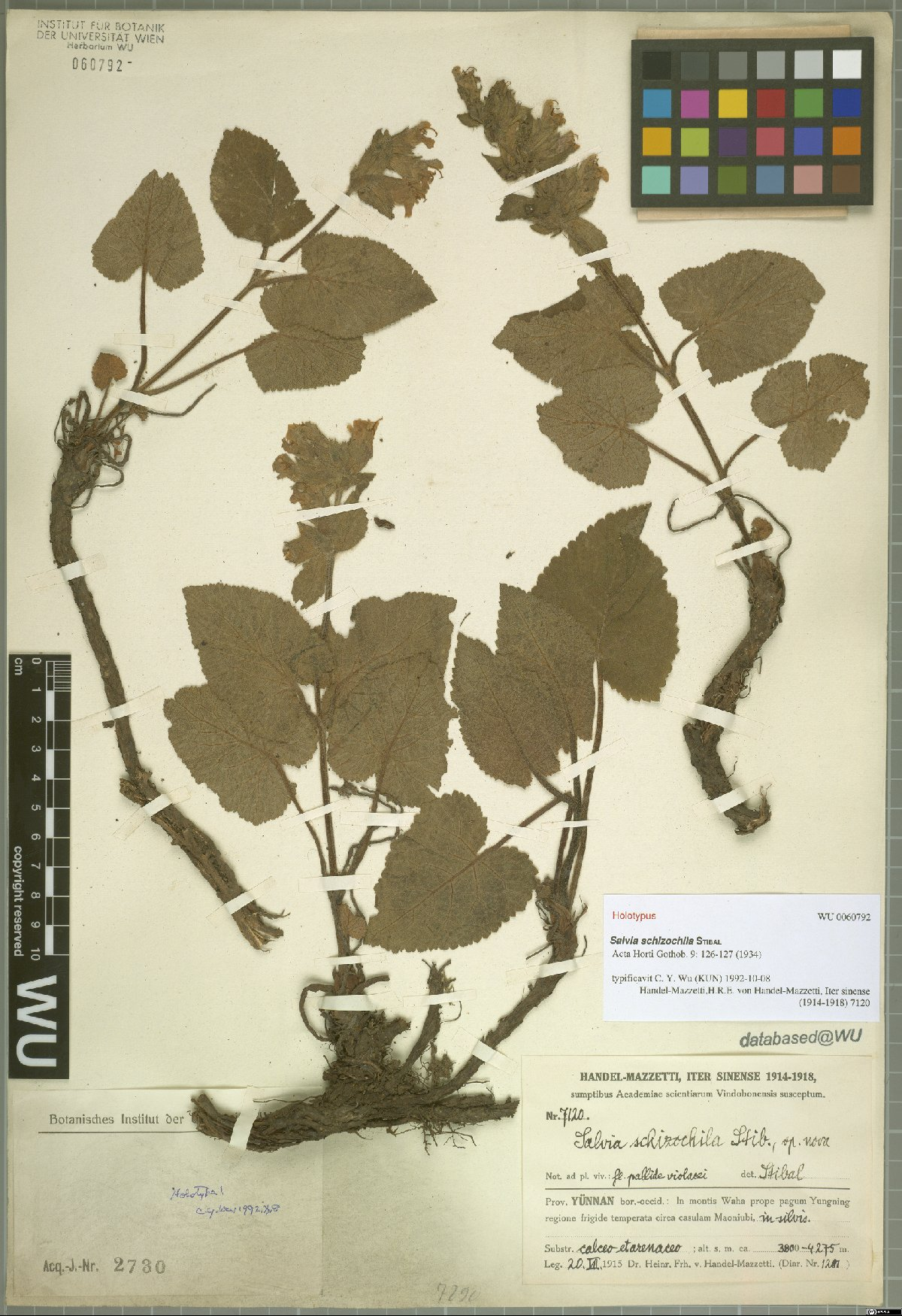

Scientific classification
- Kingdom: Plantae
- Clade: Tracheophytes
- Clade: Angiosperms
- Clade: Eudicots
- Clade: Asterids
- Order: Lamiales
- Family: Lamiaceae
- Genus: Salvia
- Species: S. schizochila

Binomial name
- Salvia schizochila E. Peter

= Salvia schizochila =

Species of flowering plant

Salvia schizochila is a perennial plant that is native to the Yunnan province in China, found growing in forests at 3,800 to 4,300 m (12,500 to 14,100 ft) elevation. S. schizochila grows on erect, unbranched stems to 20 to 25 cm (7.9 to 9.8 in) tall. The leaves are broadly cordate-ovate, ranging in size from 4 to 9 cm (1.6 to 3.5 in) long and 4 to 9 cm (1.6 to 3.5 in) wide. Inflorescences are of dense racemes, with a purplish corolla that is 1.8 to 2.2 cm (0.71 to 0.87 in).
