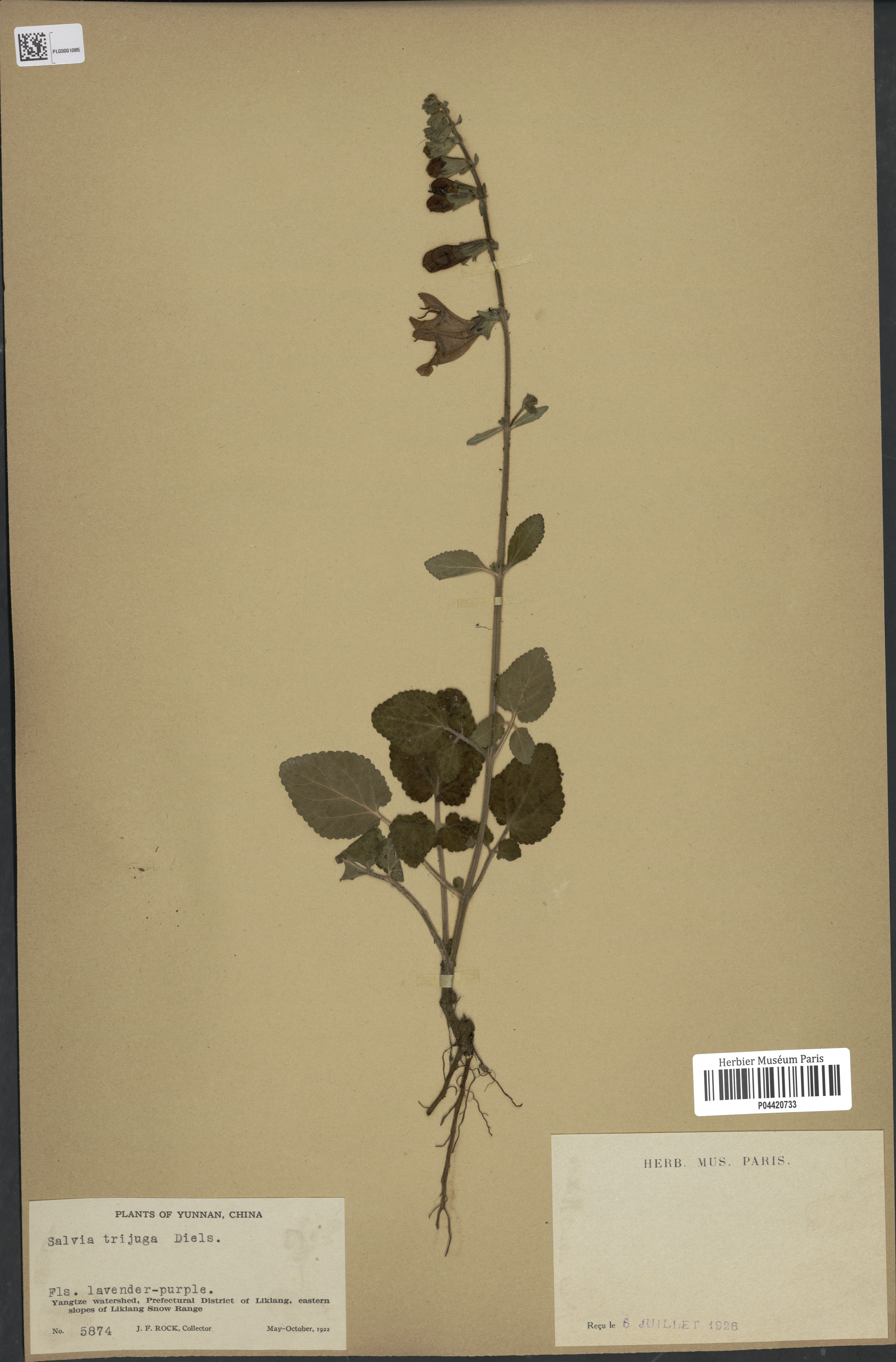

Scientific classification
- Kingdom: Plantae
- Clade: Tracheophytes
- Clade: Angiosperms
- Clade: Eudicots
- Clade: Asterids
- Order: Lamiales
- Family: Lamiaceae
- Genus: Salvia
- Species: S. trijuga

Binomial name
- Salvia trijuga Diels

= Salvia trijuga =

Species of flowering plant

Salvia trijuga (little danshen) is a perennial plant that is native to Yunnan, Sichuan, and Xizang provinces in China, found growing on hillsides, streamsides, grasslands, thickets, forests, and valleys at 1,900 to 3,900 m (6,200 to 12,800 ft) elevation. S. trijuga grows on erect stems to 30 to 60 cm (12 to 24 in) tall.

Inflorescences are widely spaced 2-flowered verticillasters in terminal racemes or panicles, with a 2 cm (0.79 in) blue-purple corolla with yellow spots.
