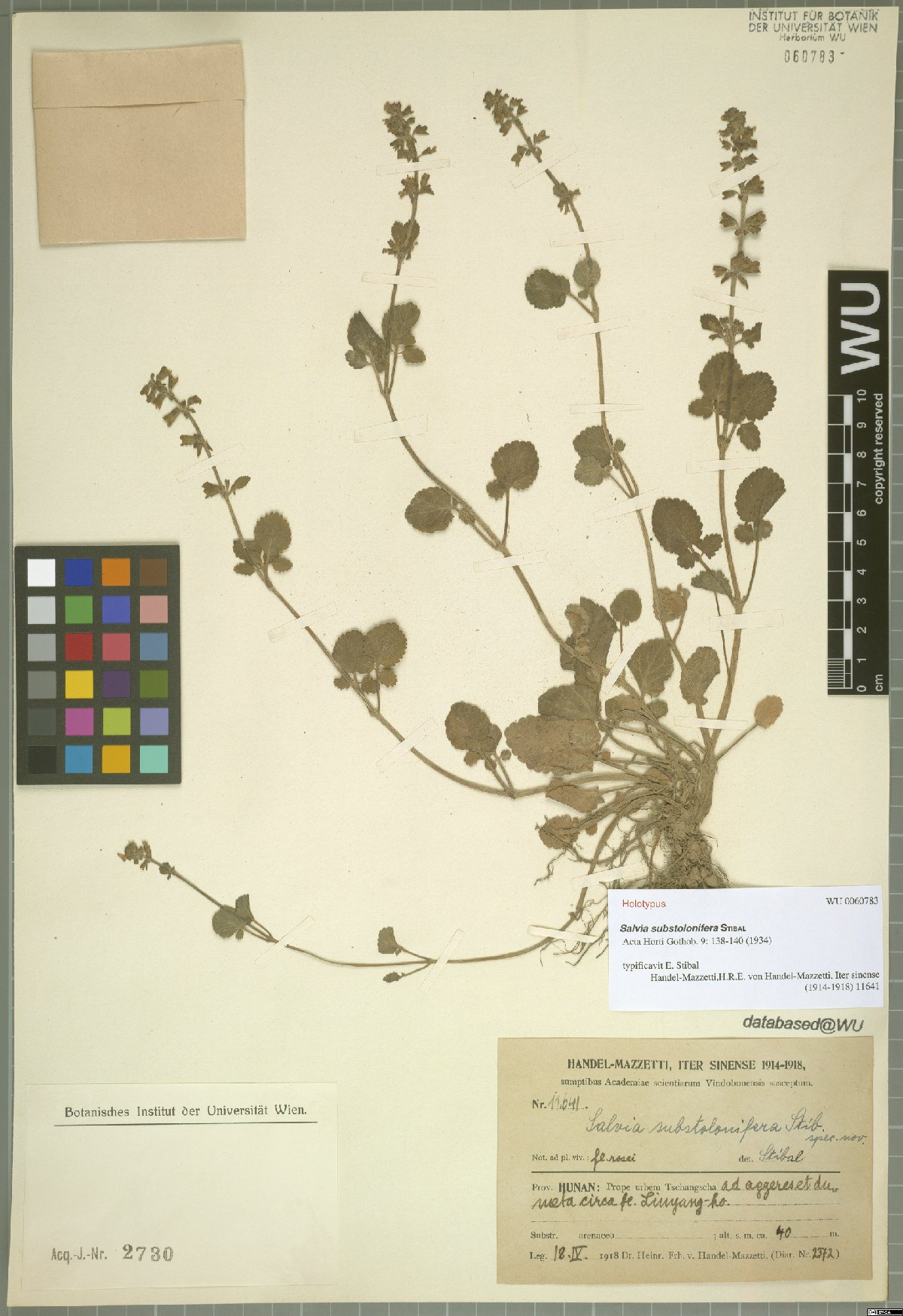

Scientific classification
- Kingdom: Plantae
- Clade: Tracheophytes
- Clade: Angiosperms
- Clade: Eudicots
- Clade: Asterids
- Order: Lamiales
- Family: Lamiaceae
- Genus: Salvia
- Species: S. substolonifera

Binomial name
- Salvia substolonifera E.Peter

= Salvia substolonifera =

Species of flowering plant

Salvia substolonifera (Buddha's Light) is an annual plant that is native to Fujian, Guizhou, Hunan, Sichuan, and Zhejiang provinces in China, growing on streamsides, crevices, and forests at sea level to 900 m (3,000 ft) elevation.

Salvia substolonifera grows on ascending or trailing stems to a height of 10 to 40 cm (3.9 to 15.7 in). Inflorescences are 2-8 flowered verticillasters in axillary or terminal racemes or panicles, with a 5 to 7 mm (0.20 to 0.28 in) reddish or purplish corolla.
