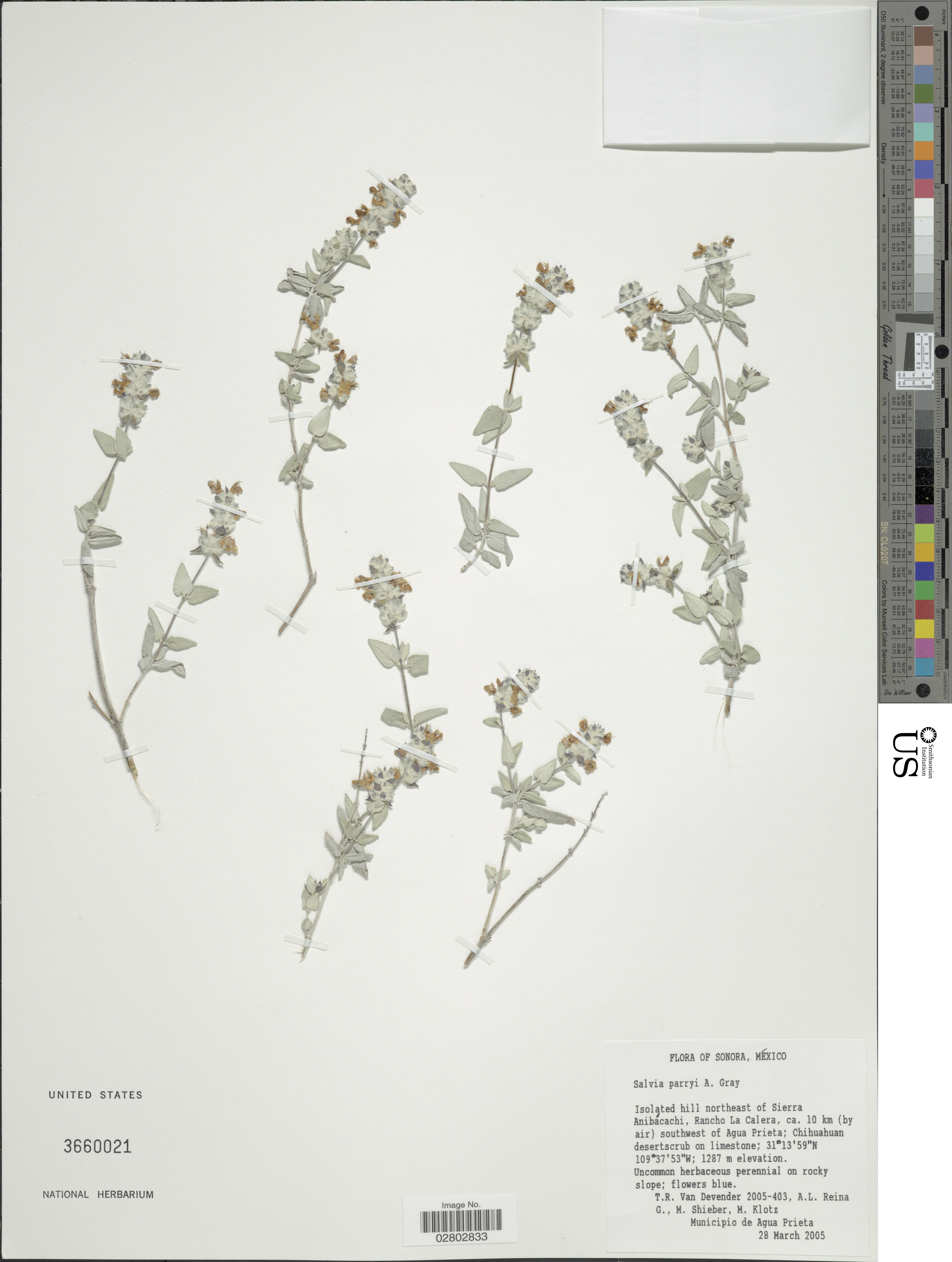

Scientific classification
- Kingdom: Plantae
- Clade: Tracheophytes
- Clade: Angiosperms
- Clade: Eudicots
- Clade: Asterids
- Order: Lamiales
- Family: Lamiaceae
- Genus: Salvia
- Species: S. parryi

Binomial name
- Salvia parryi Gray

= Salvia parryi =

Species of shrub

Salvia parryi (Parry's sage) is a perennial subshrub that is endemic to Northern Mexico (Sonora state), southwestern New Mexico, and southern Arizona, growing at 3,500 to 5,000 ft (1,100 to 1,500 m) elevation.

Native people used preparations of the roots to treat gastric disorders. Parryin is a pimarane-derived diterpene isolated from this plant. Other compounds found in this species are isopimara-8(14),15-dien-7-one, isopimara-6,8(14),15-triene and isopimara-8,15-dien-7-one.

Chemical structure of parryin
