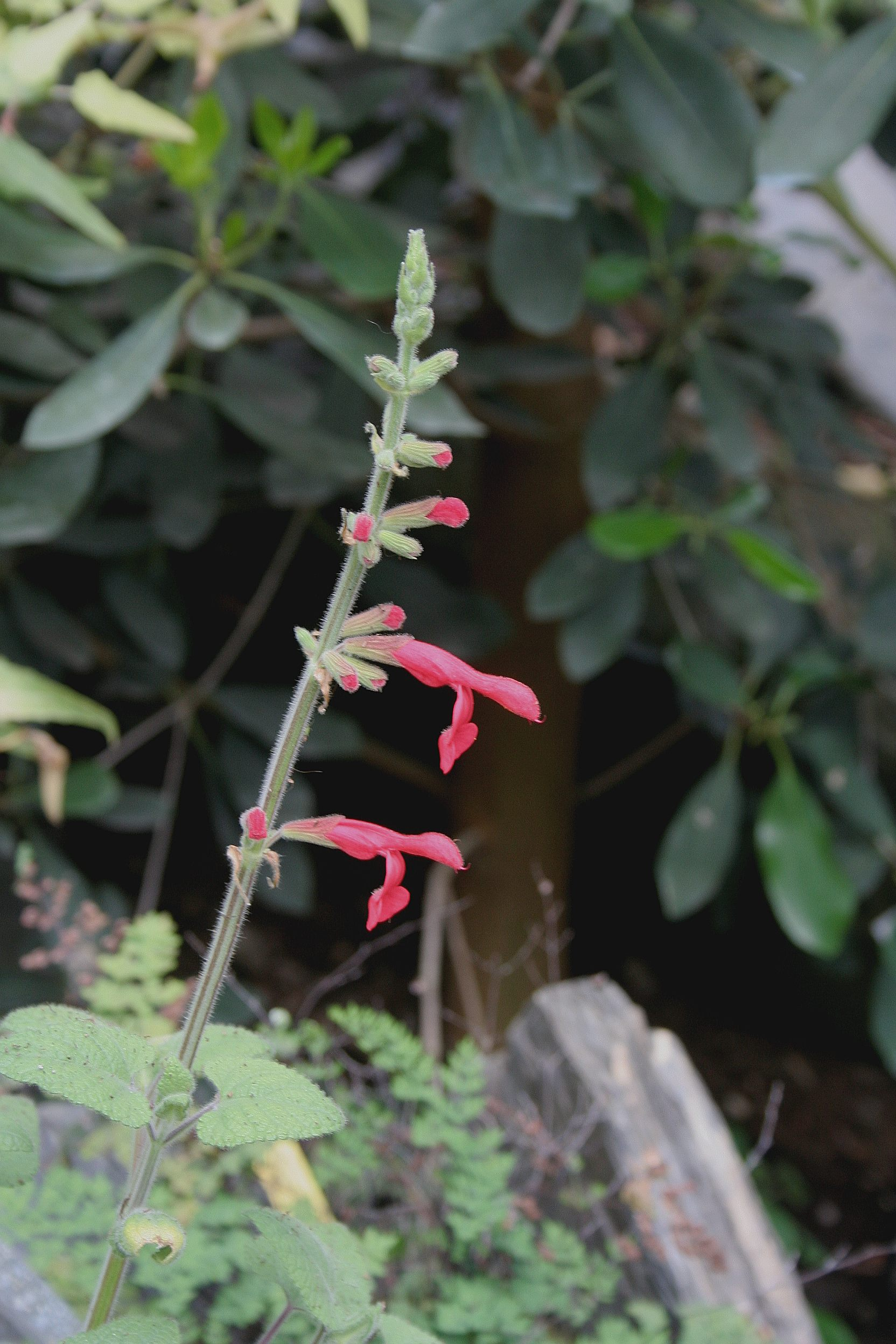

Scientific classification
- Kingdom: Plantae
- Clade: Tracheophytes
- Clade: Angiosperms
- Clade: Eudicots
- Clade: Asterids
- Order: Lamiales
- Family: Lamiaceae
- Genus: Salvia
- Species: S. darcyi

Binomial name
- Salvia darcyi Compton

= Salvia darcyi =

Species of shrub

Salvia darcyi is a herbaceous perennial shrub native to a very small area at 9000 ft elevation in the eastern range of the Mexican Sierra Madre Oriental. Discovered in the wild in 1991, it has since been sold in horticulture under several names. Botanist James Compton named the plant after fellow British botanist John d'Arcy after a trip they made to the region in 1991.

Salvia darcyi reaches 3 feet in height, with stoloniferous roots that spread over time and deltoid pastel green leaves that are very sticky. The bright coral red flowers are 1.5 inches long on inflorescences that reach up to 2 feet.
