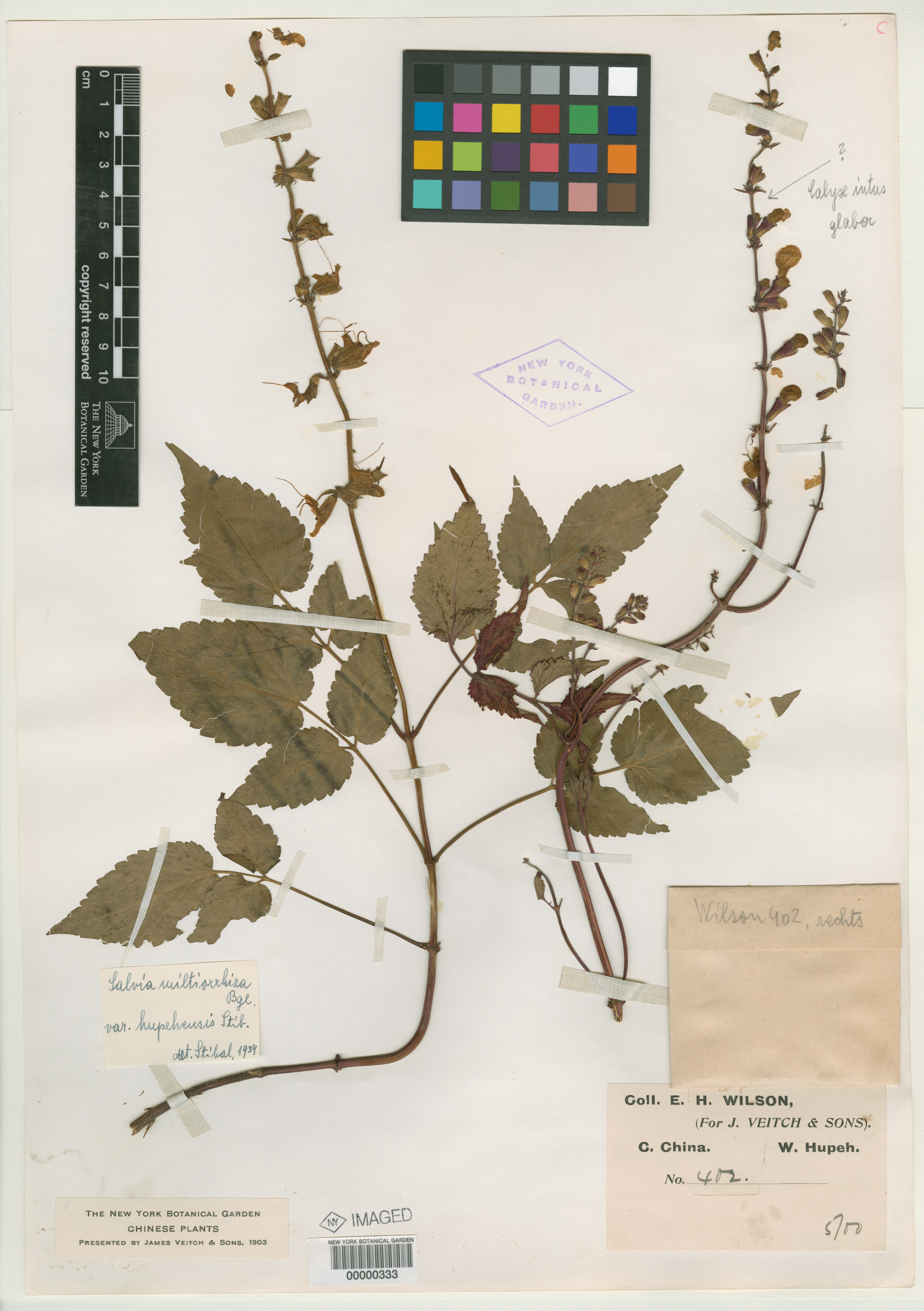

Scientific classification
- Kingdom: Plantae
- Clade: Tracheophytes
- Clade: Angiosperms
- Clade: Eudicots
- Clade: Asterids
- Order: Lamiales
- Family: Lamiaceae
- Genus: Salvia
- Species: S. paramiltiorrhiza

Binomial name
- Salvia paramiltiorrhiza H. W. Li & X. L. Huang

= Salvia paramiltiorrhiza =

Species of flowering plant

Salvia paramiltiorrhiza is a perennial plant that is native to Anhui and Hubei provinces in China, growing on hillsides and streamsides. S. paramiltiorrhiza has one to a few erect stems that reach 50 to 100 cm (20 to 39 in) tall. Inflorescences are 4–6 flowered widely spaced verticillasters, with a 2 to 2.5 cm (0.79 to 0.98 in) corolla that ranges from yellowish to yellow to purple-red
