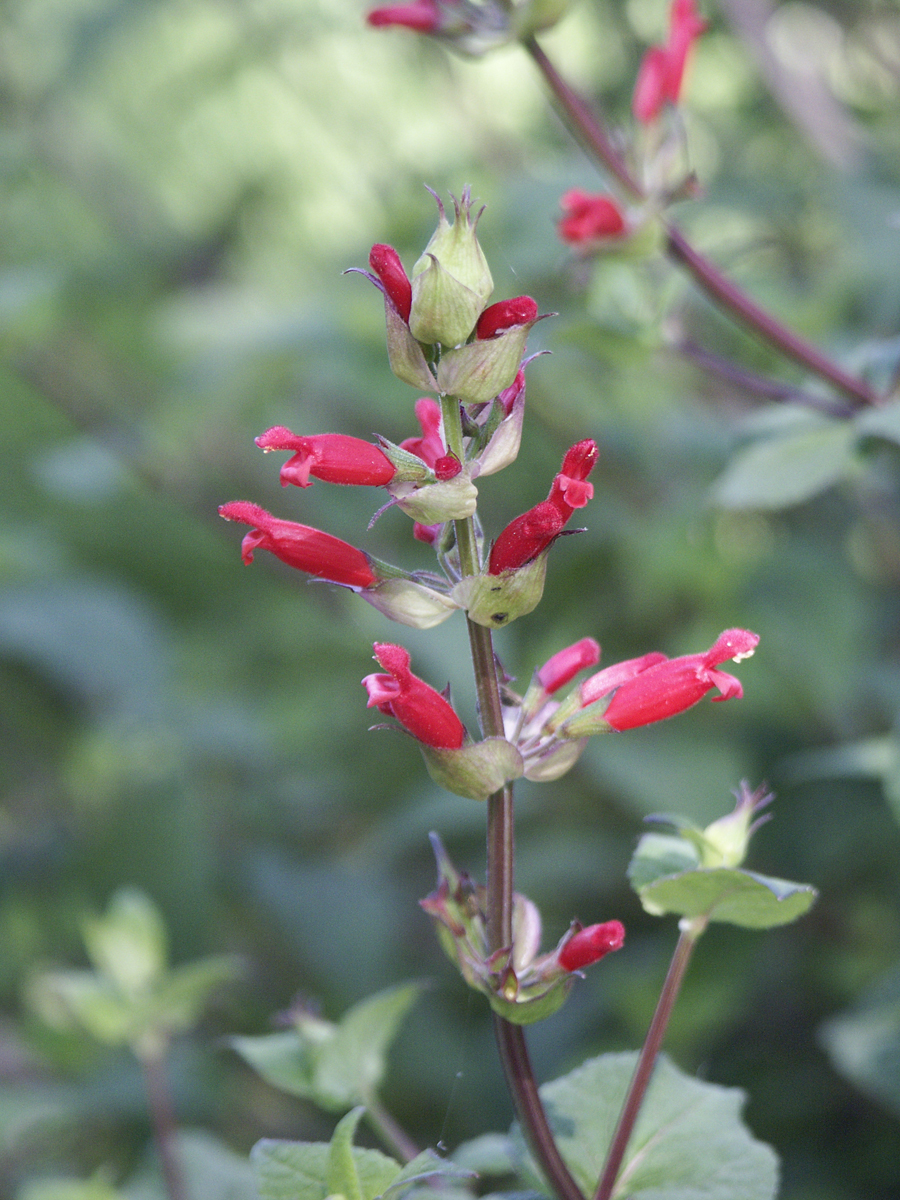

Scientific classification
- Kingdom: Plantae
- Clade: Tracheophytes
- Clade: Angiosperms
- Clade: Eudicots
- Clade: Asterids
- Order: Lamiales
- Family: Lamiaceae
- Genus: Salvia
- Species: S. holwayi

Binomial name
- Salvia holwayi Blake

= Salvia holwayi =

Species of flowering plant

Salvia holwayi is a herbaceous perennial native to Guatemala at elevations of 3,000–9,000 feet and at similar elevations in the Mexican state of Chiapas, where it frequently makes an understory in mixed pine and oak forests and thickets. It was named after 19th century plant and fungi collector Edward Willet Dorland Holway.

Salvia holwayi grows 3–5 feet tall and can easily spread to 8–10 ft in one year. Its long floppy stems grow over and into other shrubs and trees, with many 8 in inflorescences on each stem. The cardinal-red flowers are almost 1 inch long and inflated in the center. With the many inflorescences, and the closely spaced flowers blooming at the same time, the plant is very showy. The deltoid leaves are yellow-green with pronounced veining, varying in size, and averaging about 2 in long and 1 in wide. The plant is very luxurious looking.
