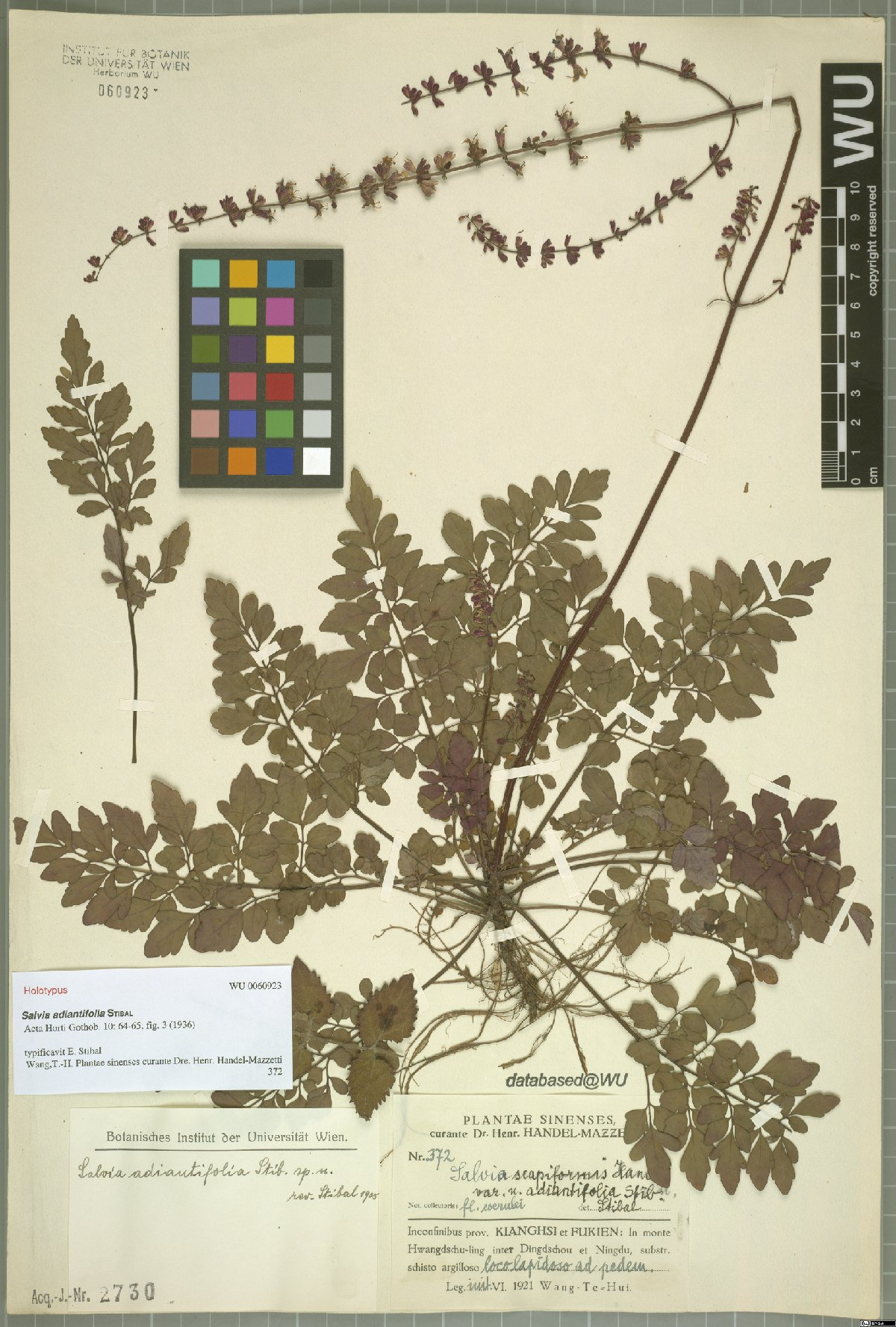

Scientific classification
- Kingdom: Plantae
- Clade: Embryophytes
- Clade: Tracheophytes
- Clade: Angiosperms
- Clade: Eudicots
- Clade: Asterids
- Order: Lamiales
- Family: Lamiaceae
- Genus: Salvia
- Species: S. adiantifolia

Binomial name
- Salvia adiantifolia E. Peter

= Salvia adiantifolia =

Species of flowering plant

Salvia adiantifolia (Wuyi Mountain sage) is a perennial plant that is native to China, and found growing in forests and in foothills. S. adiantifolia grows on one to a few ascending or erect stems to a height of 30 to 60 cm (12 to 24 in), with mostly basal leaves. Inflorescences are 4-10 flowered verticillasters, mostly in panicles, with a sky blue to white-purple corolla that is 7 to 8 mm (0.28 to 0.31 in).
