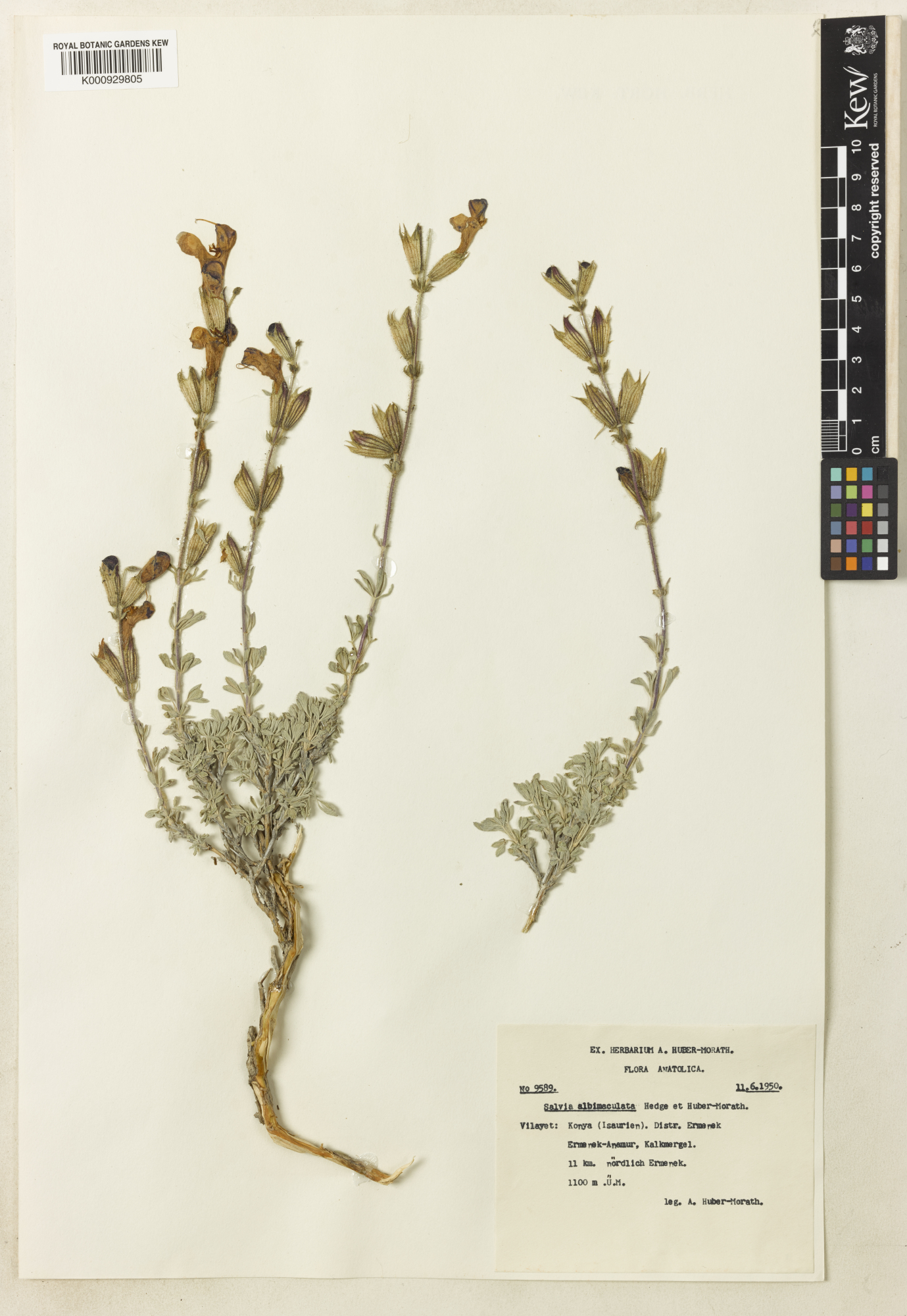

Scientific classification
- Kingdom: Plantae
- Clade: Tracheophytes
- Clade: Angiosperms
- Clade: Eudicots
- Clade: Asterids
- Order: Lamiales
- Family: Lamiaceae
- Genus: Salvia
- Species: S. albimaculata

Binomial name
- Salvia albimaculata Hedge and Huber-Morath

= Salvia albimaculata =

Species of shrub

Salvia albimaculata (handsome sage) is a perennial shrub that is native to a very small region in Turkey, at 1200 m elevation in the Taurus Mountains. It is under 30 cm tall, and about 25–30 cm wide, with small greenish-gray evergreen leaves. The royal purple flowers, with a distinctive white patch on the lower lip, are about 2.5 cm long, in whorls of 2–5. The name, albimaculata, means 'spotted with white'.
