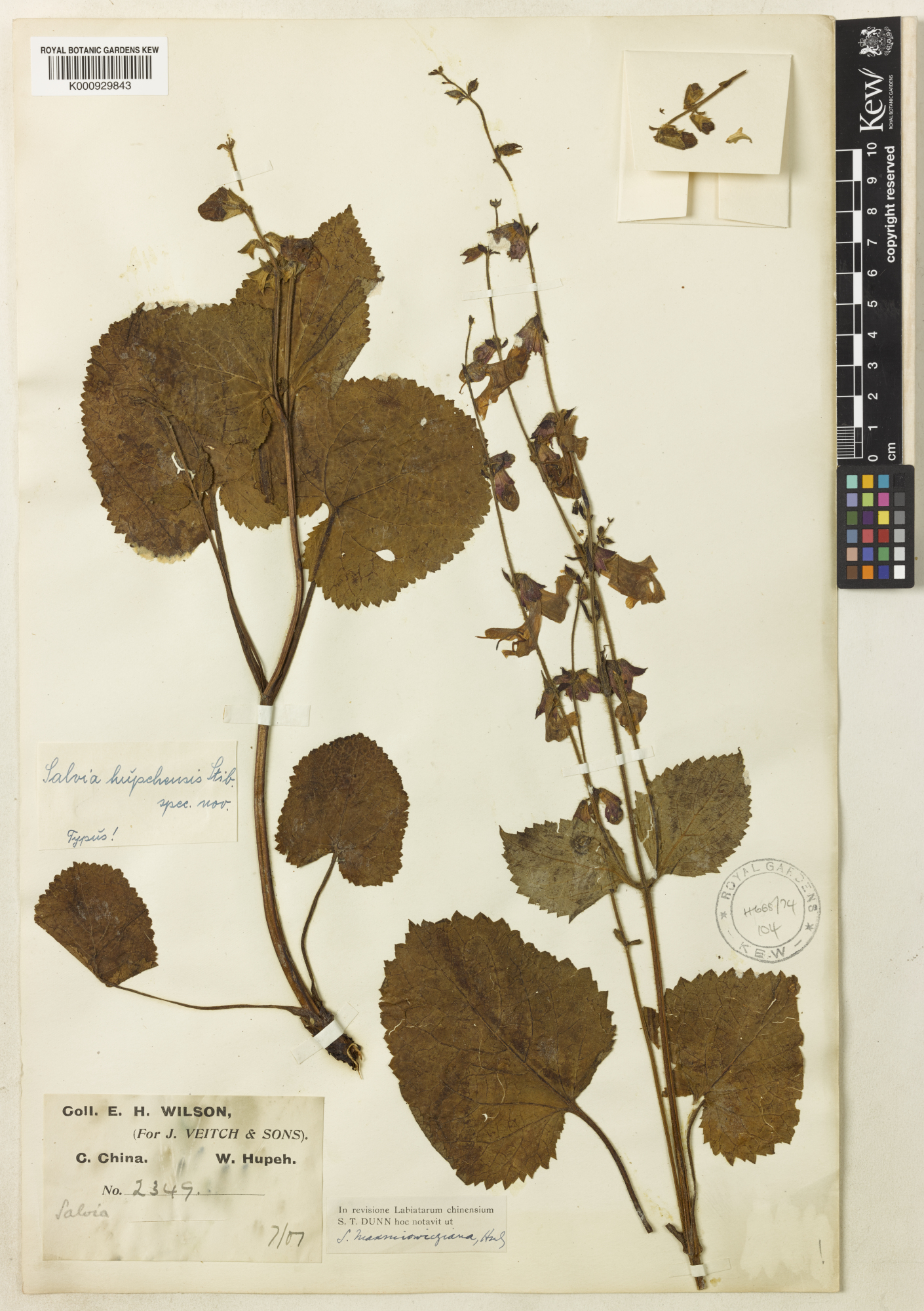

Scientific classification
- Kingdom: Plantae
- Clade: Tracheophytes
- Clade: Angiosperms
- Clade: Eudicots
- Clade: Asterids
- Order: Lamiales
- Family: Lamiaceae
- Genus: Salvia
- Species: S. hupehensis

Binomial name
- Salvia hupehensis E. Peter

= Salvia hupehensis =

Species of flowering plant

Salvia hupehensis is a perennial plant that is native to Hubei province in China. S. hupehensis is an erect plant, reaching 35 to 55 cm (14 to 22 in) tall, with cordate-orbicular leaves that are 4 to 8 cm (1.6 to 3.1 in).

Inflorescences are 2-flowered verticillasters in loose raceme-panicles, with a purple corolla that is 3 to 4.5 cm (1.2 to 1.8 in).
