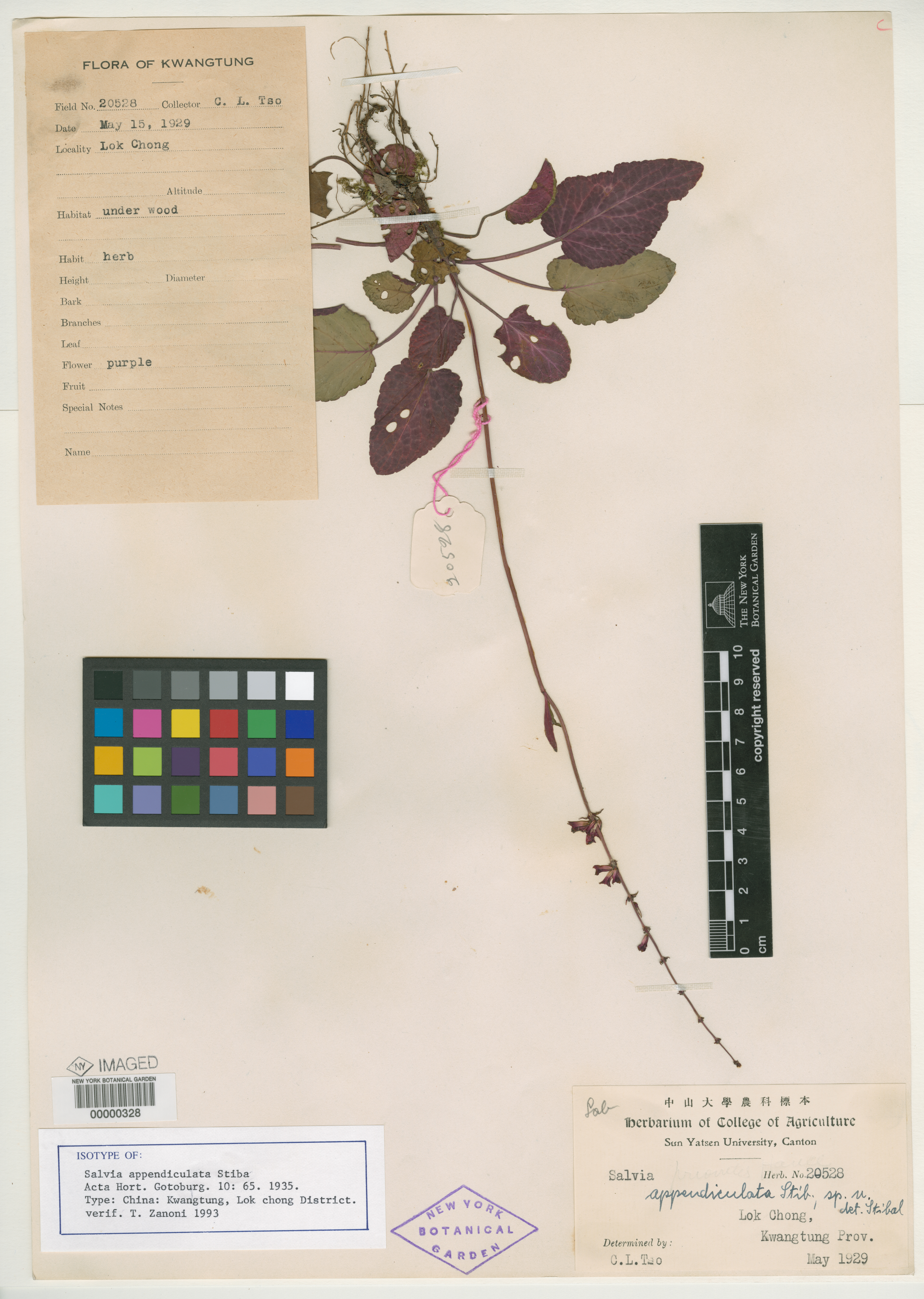

Scientific classification
- Kingdom: Plantae
- Clade: Tracheophytes
- Clade: Angiosperms
- Clade: Eudicots
- Clade: Asterids
- Order: Lamiales
- Family: Lamiaceae
- Genus: Salvia
- Species: S. appendiculata

Binomial name
- Salvia appendiculata E.Peter

= Salvia appendiculata =

Species of flowering plant

Salvia appendiculata is a perennial plant that is native to Guangdong province in China, growing in forests, open streamsides, and thickets. S. appendiculata grows on erect stems to a height of 17 to 55 cm (6.7 to 21.7 in). Inflorescences are 4-6 flowered widely spaced verticillasters in racemes or panicles, with an 8 to 10 mm (0.31 to 0.39 in) purple or dark red corolla.
