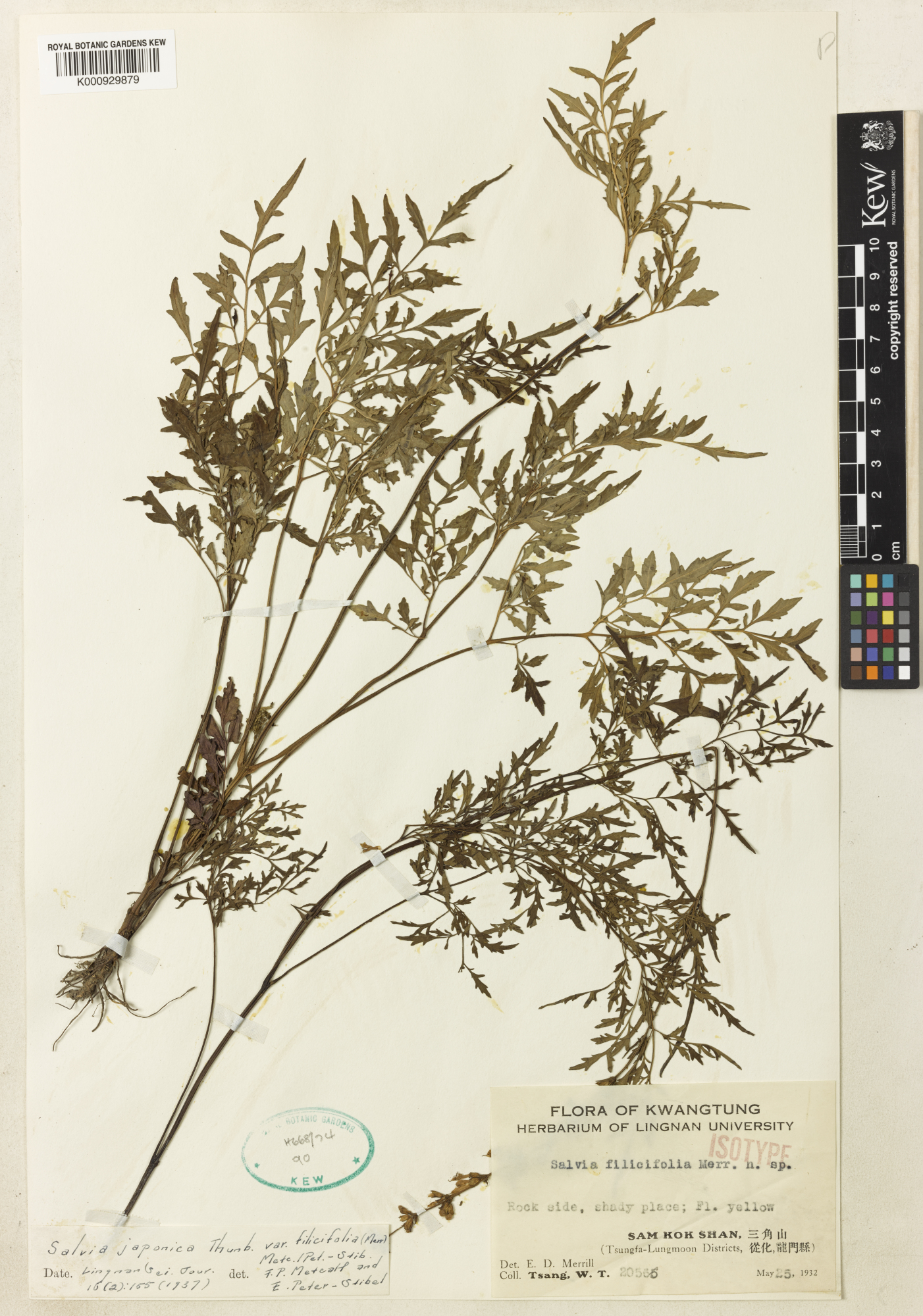

Scientific classification
- Kingdom: Plantae
- Clade: Tracheophytes
- Clade: Angiosperms
- Clade: Eudicots
- Clade: Asterids
- Order: Lamiales
- Family: Lamiaceae
- Genus: Salvia
- Species: S. filicifolia

Binomial name
- Salvia filicifolia Merr.

= Salvia filicifolia =

Species of flowering plant

Salvia filicifolia is a perennial plant that is native to Guangdong and Hunan provinces in China, growing in rocky and sandy areas. S. filicifolia grows on erect or slightly ascending stems, with inflorescences that are 6-10 flowered verticillasters in pedunculate racemes or panicles, with a 8 mm (0.31 in) yellow corolla.
