= Salvia fragarioides =

Scientific classification
- Kingdom: Plantae
- Clade: Tracheophytes
- Clade: Angiosperms
- Clade: Eudicots
- Clade: Asterids
- Order: Lamiales
- Family: Lamiaceae
- Genus: Salvia
- Species: S. fragarioides

Binomial name
- Salvia fragarioides C. Y. Wu

Species of flowering plant

Salvia fragarioides is a perennial plant that is native to Yunnan province in China, growing on rocky riverbanks at 800 m (2,600 ft) elevation. S. fragarioides grows on ascending or suberect stems to a height of 20 to 30 cm (7.9 to 11.8 in), with basal or subbasal leaves. Inflorescences are 2 to many-flowered widely spaced verticillasters. It is a close ally of Salvia japonica.
