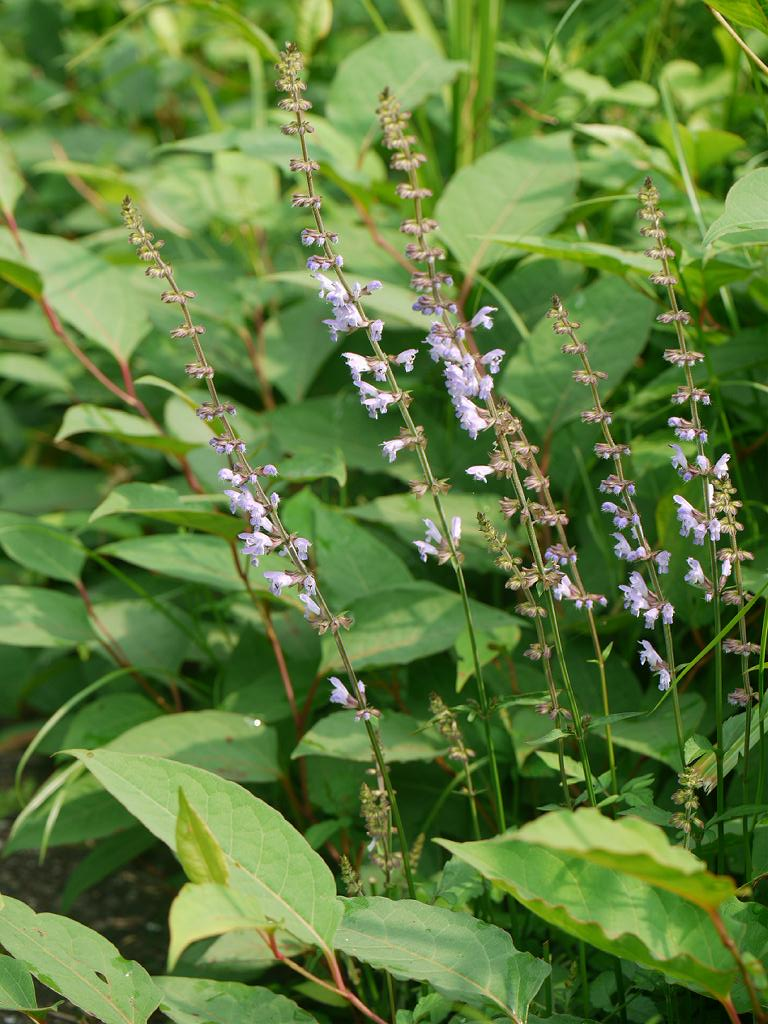

Scientific classification
- Kingdom: Plantae
- Clade: Embryophytes
- Clade: Tracheophytes
- Clade: Spermatophytes
- Clade: Angiosperms
- Clade: Eudicots
- Clade: Asterids
- Order: Lamiales
- Family: Lamiaceae
- Genus: Salvia
- Species: S. japonica

Binomial name
- Salvia japonica Thunb.

Varieties
- S. japonica var. japonica; S. japonica var. multifoliolata E. Peter

= Salvia japonica =

Species of flowering plant

Salvia japonica, known as East Asian sage, is an annual plant that is native to several provinces in China and Taiwan, growing at 200 to 1,200 m (660 to 3,940 ft) elevation. S. japonica grows on erect stems to 40 to 60 cm (16 to 24 in) tall. Inflorescences are 2-6 flowered verticillasters in terminal racemes or panicles, with a corolla that varies in color from reddish, purplish, bluish, to white, and is approximately 1.2 cm (0.47 in).

There are two named varieties, with slight variations in leaf and flower shape: S. japonica var. japonica and S. japonica var. multifoliolata.
