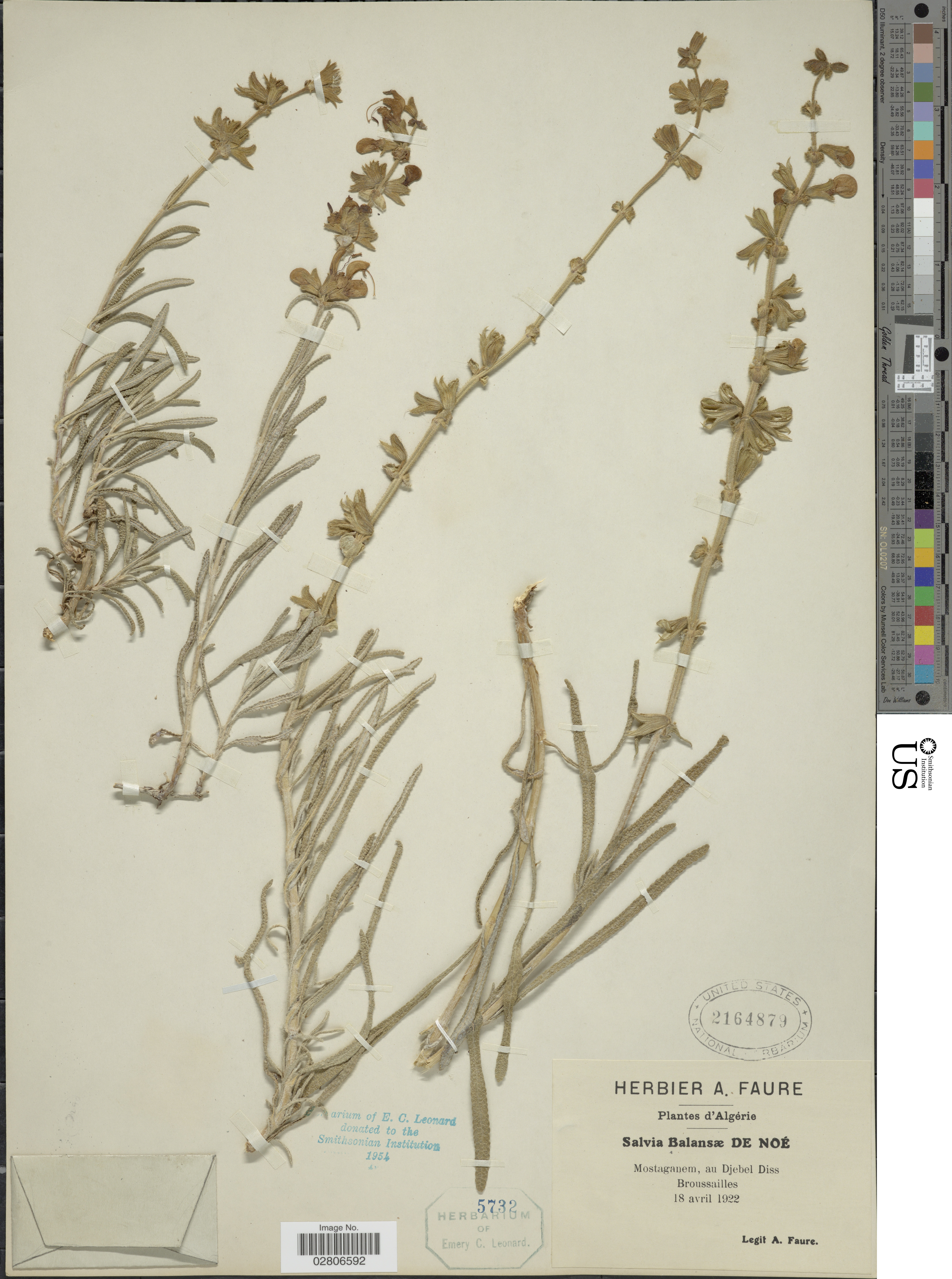

Scientific classification
- Kingdom: Plantae
- Clade: Tracheophytes
- Clade: Angiosperms
- Clade: Eudicots
- Clade: Asterids
- Order: Lamiales
- Family: Lamiaceae
- Genus: Salvia
- Species: S. balansae

Binomial name
- Salvia balansae Noë ex Coss.

= Salvia balansae =

Species of plant

Salvia balansae a perennial plant species of the family Lamiaceae. It is native to Algeria.
