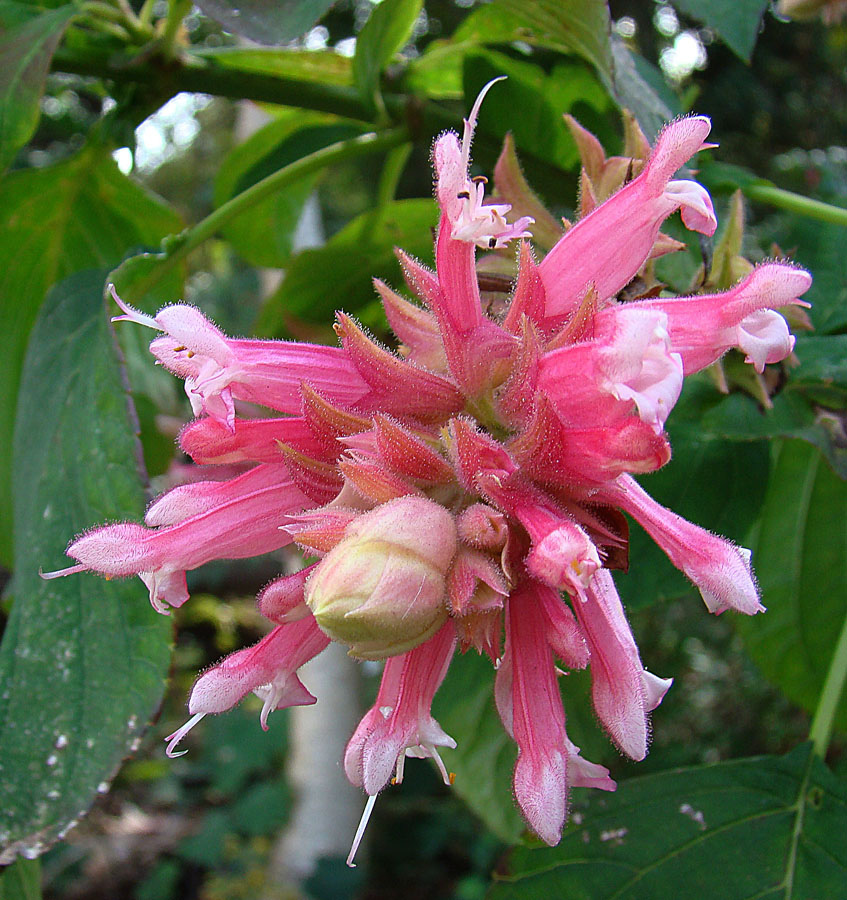
- Salvia wagneriana

Scientific classification
- Kingdom: Plantae
- Clade: Tracheophytes
- Clade: Angiosperms
- Clade: Eudicots
- Clade: Asterids
- Order: Lamiales
- Family: Lamiaceae
- Genus: Salvia
- Species: S. wagneriana

Binomial name
- Salvia wagneriana Pol.

= Salvia wagneriana =

Species of plant

Salvia wagneriana is a perennial found in Nicaragua, Costa Rica, Guatemala, El Salvador, and the Mexican state of Chiapas, growing at 4,000 to 6,500 feet (1,200 to 2,000 m) elevation in warm, moist areas.

== Description ==
Salvia wagneriana grows up to 9 feet (2.7 m) tall and 4 feet (1.2 m) wide, with yellow-green leaves that sometimes have purple veins. The underside of the leaf has raised veins. The flowers range in color from bright red to rose to pinkish cream, with highly colored bracts and calyces that are different colors than the flower. The showy flowers are 1 to 3 inches (2.5 to 7.6 cm) long.

== Cultivation ==
It is very popular among gardeners near its native habitat, and one of the few native plants taken from the wild by local gardeners. It is described sometimes as a herb and sometimes as a shrub by various botanists.
