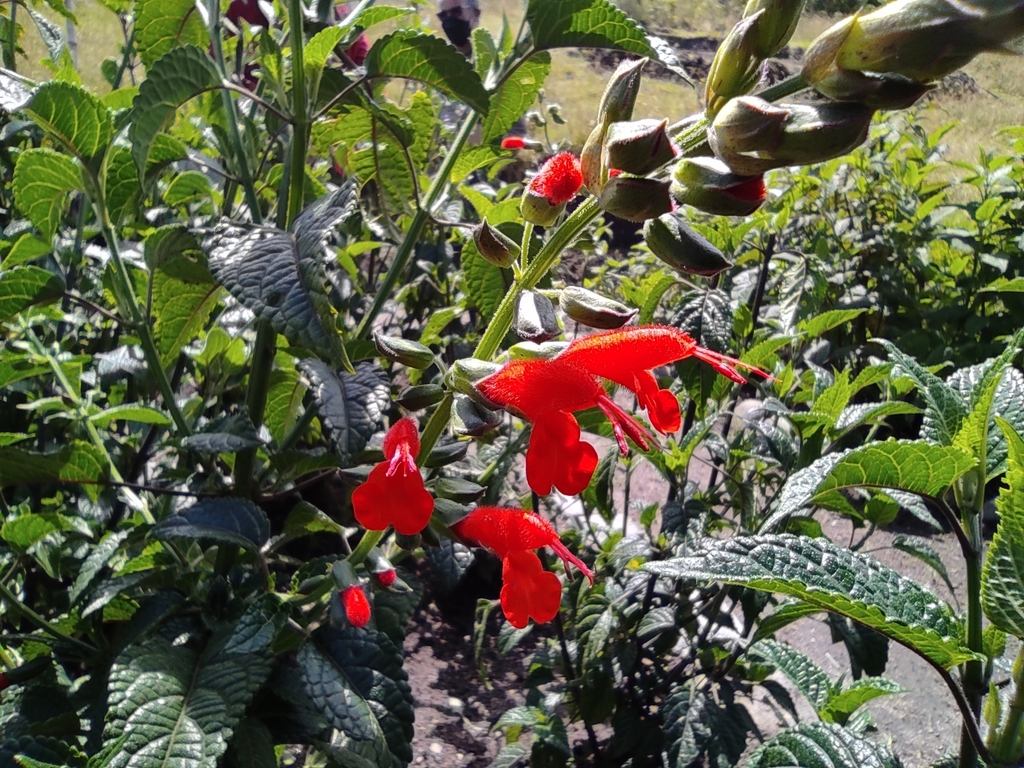

Scientific classification
- Kingdom: Plantae
- Clade: Tracheophytes
- Clade: Angiosperms
- Clade: Eudicots
- Clade: Asterids
- Order: Lamiales
- Family: Lamiaceae
- Genus: Salvia
- Species: S. pauciserrata

Binomial name
- Salvia pauciserrata Benth.

Subspecies
- S. pauciserrata subsp. pauciserrata; S. pauciserrata subsp. derasa (Benth.) J. R. I. Wood& R. Harley; S. pauciserrata subsp. lasiocalicina J.R.I. Wood & Harley; S. pauciserrata subsp. erythrocalicina J.R.I. Wood & Harley; S. pauciserrata subsp. calocalicina (Briq.) J. R. I. Wood& R. Harley

= Salvia pauciserrata =

Species of flowering plant

Salvia pauciserrata is a variable and widely distributed species of Salvia native to Peru, north to Venezuela and Costa Rica. It is found in a wide variety of habitats. It reaches 1 to 2 m (3.3 to 6.6 ft) tall. The inflorescence is of terminal racemes, with a large red corolla that is 2.5 to 4 cm (0.98 to 1.57 in) long.
