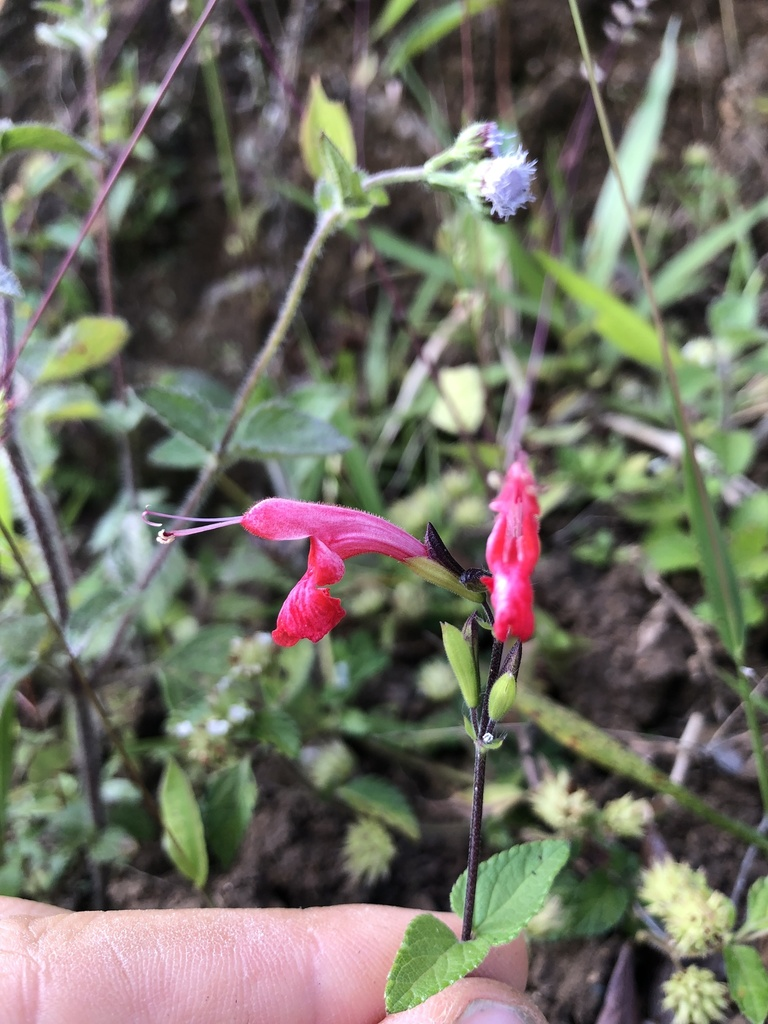

Scientific classification
- Kingdom: Plantae
- Clade: Tracheophytes
- Clade: Angiosperms
- Clade: Eudicots
- Clade: Asterids
- Order: Lamiales
- Family: Lamiaceae
- Genus: Salvia
- Species: S. nubigena

Binomial name
- Salvia nubigena J.R.I. Wood & Harley

= Salvia nubigena =

Species of shrub

Salvia nubigena is a perennial undershrub endemic to a very small region in the Rio Concavo Valley in Colombia. It if found on rough bushland on boulder covered slopes, growing at elevations from 3,500 to 3,800 m (11,500 to 12,500 ft).

The plant reaches 1 to 2.5 m (3.3 to 8.2 ft) high, with 4-angled stems. The narrow lanceolate or ovate leaves are 3 to 7 cm (1.2 to 2.8 in) long and 1.3 to 2 cm (0.51 to 0.79 in) wide. The inflorescence of terminal racemes is 5 to 15 cm (2.0 to 5.9 in) long, with a deep pink 2.1 cm (0.83 in) corolla.
