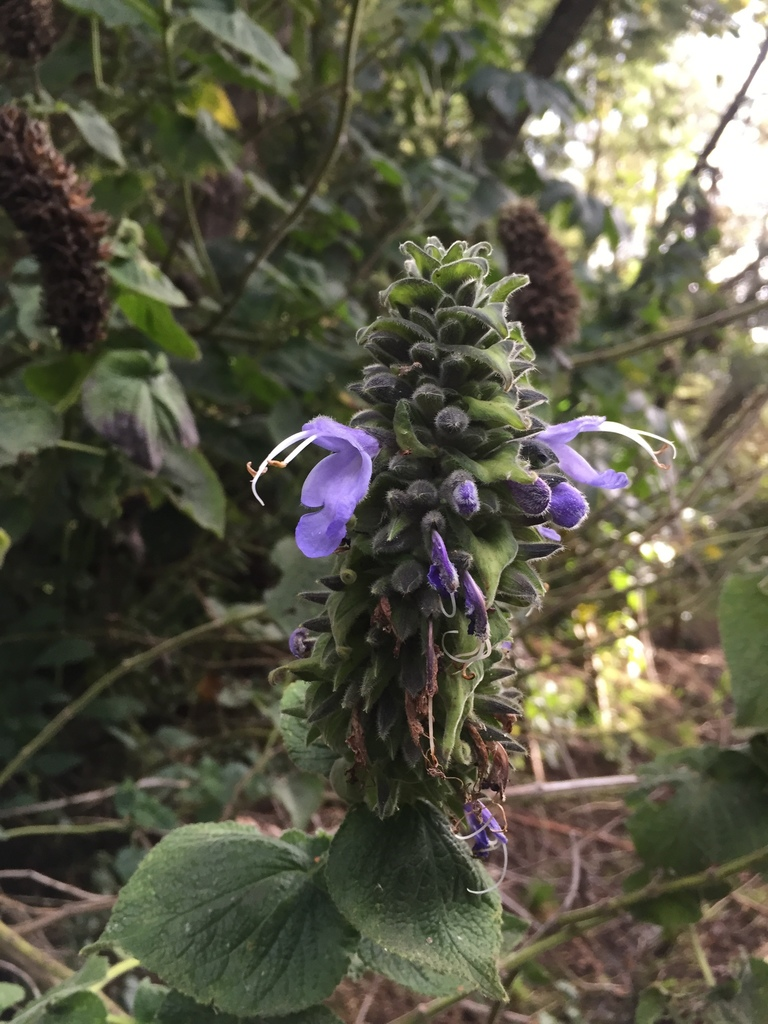

Scientific classification
- Kingdom: Plantae
- Clade: Tracheophytes
- Clade: Angiosperms
- Clade: Eudicots
- Clade: Asterids
- Order: Lamiales
- Family: Lamiaceae
- Genus: Salvia
- Species: S. macrostachya

Binomial name
- Salvia macrostachya Kunth

= Salvia macrostachya =

Species of herb

Salvia macrostachya is a rare herb native to Ecuador and southern Colombia, with no specific information about its native habitat. A woody, clump-forming plant, it grows up to 4 metres (13 ft) high on thick stems, with broadly ovate leaves that are approximately 8 to 12 cm (3.1 to 4.7 in) long and wide. The inflorescence is of very dense terminal racemes that are 10 to 30 cm (3.9 to 11.8 in) long. The blue corolla is approximately 2.5 cm (0.98 in) in long.
