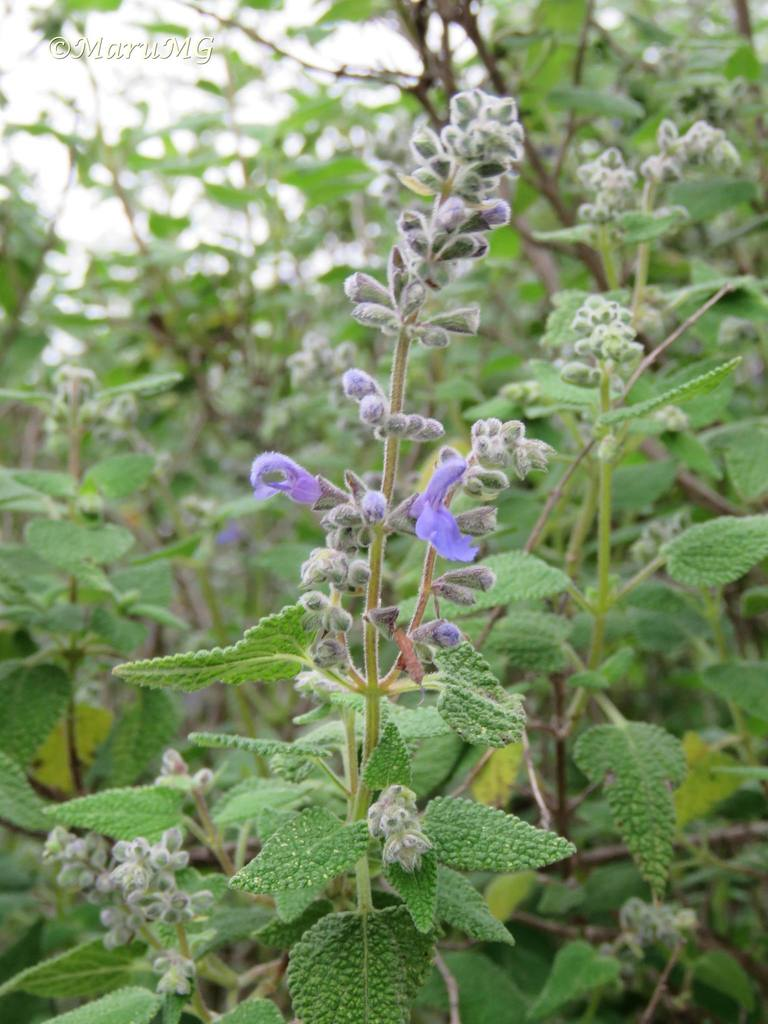

Scientific classification
- Kingdom: Plantae
- Clade: Tracheophytes
- Clade: Angiosperms
- Clade: Eudicots
- Clade: Asterids
- Order: Lamiales
- Family: Lamiaceae
- Genus: Salvia
- Species: S. keerlii

Binomial name
- Salvia keerlii Benth.

= Salvia keerlii =

Species of flowering plant

Salvia keerlii is a herbaceous perennial that is native to Mexico. It freely branches, reaching up to 1 m (3.3 ft) tall and wide. The ovate-lanceolate leaves are grayish, reaching 4 cm (1.6 in), and aromatic. The lilac flowers grow in whorls on short inflorescences, blooming midsummer to autumn.
