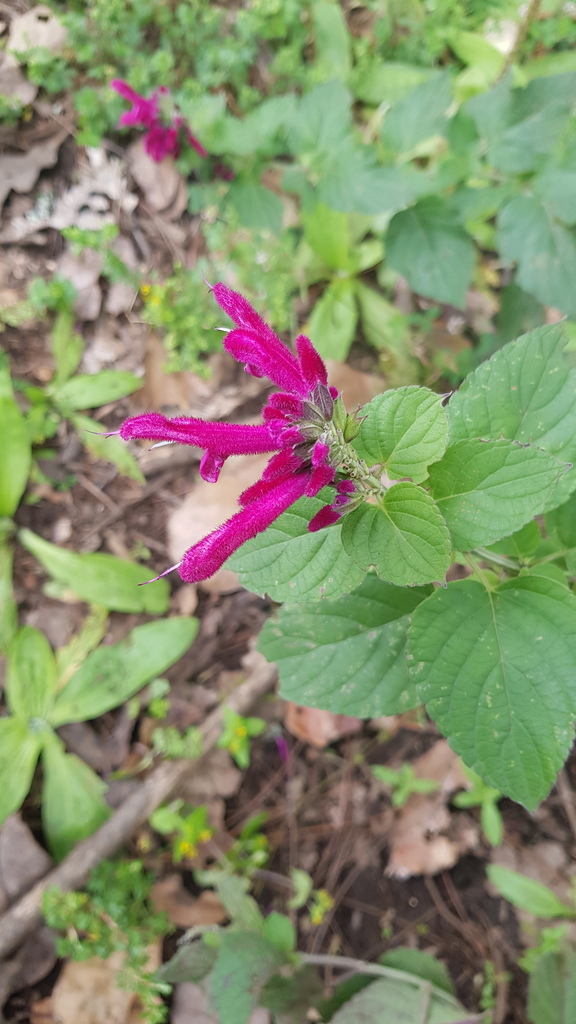

Scientific classification
- Kingdom: Plantae
- Clade: Tracheophytes
- Clade: Angiosperms
- Clade: Eudicots
- Clade: Asterids
- Order: Lamiales
- Family: Lamiaceae
- Genus: Salvia
- Species: S. littae

Binomial name
- Salvia littae Visiani

= Salvia littae =

Species of flowering plant

Salvia littae is a herbaceous perennial native to the Mexican state of Oaxaca, growing at elevations of 8,000-10,000 feet. The plants typically grow in some shade in groups at the edge of moist oak forest, or cloud forest.

Salvia littae grows 4–6 feet tall and up to 6 feet wide, forming thickets when left alone. The plant puts out many leafy stems which easily root when they touch the ground. The 1-3 inch medium-green leaves grow profusely on the plant, and are glabrous and rounded. Inflorescences reach up to 1 foot tall, with the flowers growing in tight verticils. The 1 inch flowers are a brilliant magenta, and covered with hairs. The upper lip is upright, and the lower lip is wide open. The two-part lower lip appears curled under, unusual in salvia plants. The small calyx is a bright lime-green, adding to the attractiveness of the flowers.
