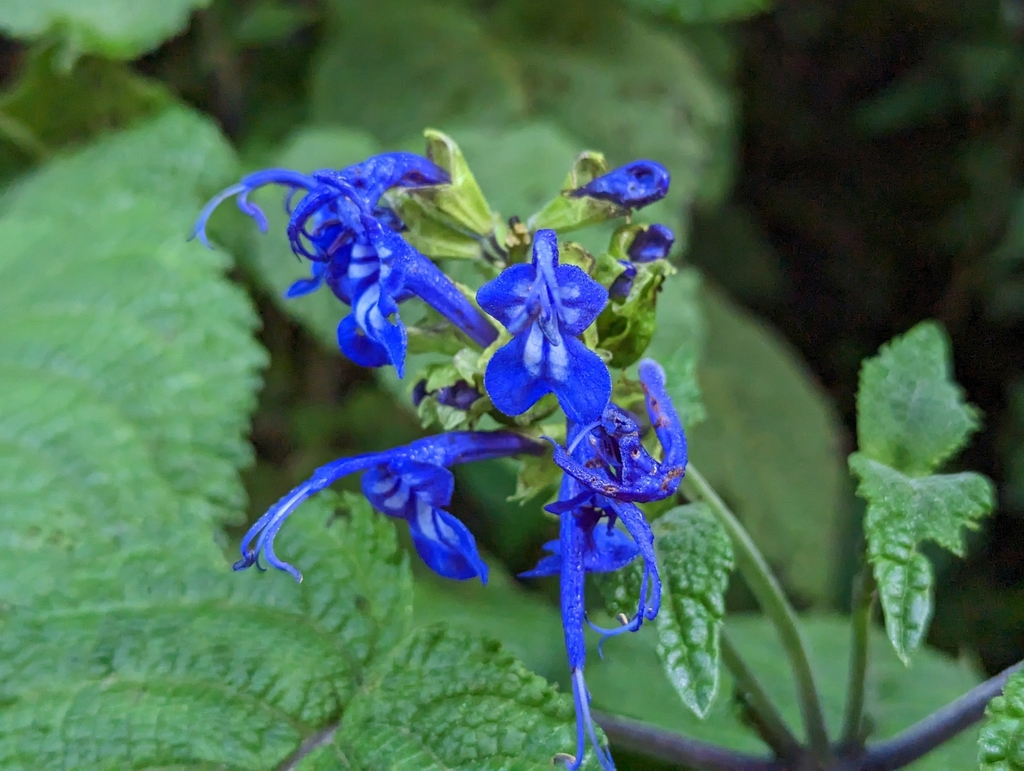

Scientific classification
- Kingdom: Plantae
- Clade: Tracheophytes
- Clade: Angiosperms
- Clade: Eudicots
- Clade: Asterids
- Order: Lamiales
- Family: Lamiaceae
- Genus: Salvia
- Species: S. pichinchensis

Binomial name
- Salvia pichinchensis Benth.

= Salvia pichinchensis =

Species of plant

Salvia pichinchensis is a species of flowering plant in the genus Salvia.
