= Salvia nanchuanensis =

Scientific classification
- Kingdom: Plantae
- Clade: Embryophytes
- Clade: Tracheophytes
- Clade: Spermatophytes
- Clade: Angiosperms
- Clade: Eudicots
- Clade: Asterids
- Order: Lamiales
- Family: Lamiaceae
- Genus: Salvia
- Species: S. nanchuanensis

Binomial name
- Salvia nanchuanensis Sun

Varieties
- S. nanchuanensis var. nanchuanensis; S. nanchuanensis var. pteridifolia Sun

Species of herb

Salvia nanchuanensis (Nanchuan Sage) is an annual or biennial herb that is native to Hubei and Sichuan provinces in China, growing on riverbanks, rocky slopes, and open areas at 1,700 to 1,800 m (5,600 to 5,900 ft) elevation. S. nanchuanensis grows on erect stems to 35 cm (14 in) tall. Inflorescences are widely spaced 2–6 flowered verticillasters in terminal racemes, with a reddish corolla that is approximately 1.1 cm (0.43 in).

There are two named varieties. S. nanchuanensis var. nanchuanensis has leaves that are 1–2 pinnately compound, with terminal leaflets that are ovate to lanceolate. S. nanchuanensis var. pteridifolia has leaves that are 3–4 pinnately compound, with terminal leaflets or lobules linear.
