= Salvia himmelbaurii =

Scientific classification
- Kingdom: Plantae
- Clade: Tracheophytes
- Clade: Angiosperms
- Clade: Eudicots
- Clade: Asterids
- Order: Lamiales
- Family: Lamiaceae
- Genus: Salvia
- Species: S. himmelbaurii

Binomial name
- Salvia himmelbaurii E.Peter

Species of flowering plant

Salvia himmelbaurii (the Mount Wa sage) is a perennial plant that is found growing on grassy slopes at 3,300 m (10,800 ft) elevation in Sichuan province in China. It grows 30 to 45 cm (12 to 18 in) tall, with cordate-ovate leaves that are 5 to 10 cm (2.0 to 3.9 in) long and 3.5 to 7.5 cm (1.4 to 3.0 in) wide. The upper leaf surface is covered with soft hairs, with the underside having hairs especially on the veins.

The inflorescence is of terminal racemes or panicles, 7 to 20 cm (2.8 to 7.9 in) long. The corolla is purple or white, with purple or yellow spots above the throat, and 2.5 to 3.5 cm (0.98 to 1.38 in) long, blooming in June–July.
