= Salvia marashica =

Scientific classification
- Kingdom: Plantae
- Clade: Tracheophytes
- Clade: Angiosperms
- Clade: Eudicots
- Clade: Asterids
- Order: Lamiales
- Family: Lamiaceae
- Genus: Salvia
- Species: S. marashica

Binomial name
- Salvia marashica A. İlçim, F. Celep & Doğan

Species of flowering plant

Salvia marashica is a rare perennial plant that is endemic to Ahır Mountain, near Kahramanmaraş in Turkey. It grows on rocky mountain slopes at 850 to 1,700 m (2,790 to 5,580 ft) elevation.

S. marashica grows erect on many stems to 30 to 70 cm (12 to 28 in), with pinnatisect leaves that are 1.2 to 7 cm (0.47 to 2.76 in) long and .3 to 1.8 cm (0.12 to 0.71 in) wide. The inflorescence is unusual for Salvia species, being covered in black-headed glandular hairs. The corolla is pink, and 2 to 2.8 cm (0.79 to 1.10 in) long. The specific epithet comes from the name of the city, "Kahramanmaras", where the type specimen was collected.
