= Salvia bifidocalyx =

Scientific classification
- Kingdom: Plantae
- Clade: Tracheophytes
- Clade: Angiosperms
- Clade: Eudicots
- Clade: Asterids
- Order: Lamiales
- Family: Lamiaceae
- Genus: Salvia
- Species: S. bifidocalyx

Binomial name
- Salvia bifidocalyx C. Y. Wu & Y. C. Huang

Species of flowering plant

Salvia bifidocalyx (Yunnan cleft sage) is a perennial plant that is native to Yunnan province in China, found growing on rocky mountains at 3,500 m (11,500 ft) elevation. S. bifidocalyx has a few slender ascending stems that reach 33 cm (13 in) tall, with hastate leaves that are 2 to 5 cm (0.79 to 1.97 in) long and 1.7 to 3 cm (0.67 to 1.18 in) wide.

Inflorescences are 2–4 flowered verticillasters in terminal racemes or panicles, 2 to 9 cm (0.79 to 3.54 in) long. The 1.5 to 1.7 cm (0.59 to 0.67 in) corolla is yellow-brown, with purple-black spots on lower lip.
