= Salvia vasta =

Scientific classification
- Kingdom: Plantae
- Clade: Tracheophytes
- Clade: Angiosperms
- Clade: Eudicots
- Clade: Asterids
- Order: Lamiales
- Family: Lamiaceae
- Genus: Salvia
- Species: S. vasta

Binomial name
- Salvia vasta H. W. Li

Varieties
- S. vasta var. vasta; S. vasta var. fimbriata H. W. Li

Species of flowering plant

Salvia vasta is a perennial plant that is native to Hubei province in China, growing on the margins of fields and on hillsides. The plant grows on erect stems, typically 30 to 40 cm (12 to 16 in) tall, sometimes to 100 cm (39 in). Inflorescences are terminal raceme-panicles that are 15 to 35 cm (5.9 to 13.8 in) long, with a yellow or purple corolla that is 2.5 cm (0.98 in).

There are two named varieties. The margin of the middle lobe of the corolla lip of Salvia vasta var. vasta is entire or undulate, while that of Salvia vasta var. fimbriata is fimbriate-denticulate.
