= Salvia lankongensis =

Scientific classification
- Kingdom: Plantae
- Clade: Tracheophytes
- Clade: Angiosperms
- Clade: Eudicots
- Clade: Asterids
- Order: Lamiales
- Family: Lamiaceae
- Genus: Salvia
- Species: S. lankongensis

Binomial name
- Salvia lankongensis C. Y. Wu

Species of flowering plant

Salvia lankongensis is a perennial plant that is native to Yunnan province in China, growing in grasslands and thickets at 3,800 m (12,500 ft) elevation. S. lankongensis grows on erect stems to 23 to 28 cm (9.1 to 11.0 in) tall. The leaves are elliptic-ovate, typically ranging in size from 2.5 to 6 cm (0.98 to 2.36 in) long and 1.5 to 4.5 cm (0.59 to 1.77 in) wide. Inflorescences are 6-flowered verticillasters, in terminal racemes or raceme-panicles with a blue corolla that is 1.7 to 1.9 cm (0.67 to 0.75 in).
