= Salvia pogonochila =

Scientific classification
- Kingdom: Plantae
- Clade: Tracheophytes
- Clade: Angiosperms
- Clade: Eudicots
- Clade: Asterids
- Order: Lamiales
- Family: Lamiaceae
- Genus: Salvia
- Species: S. pogonochila

Binomial name
- Salvia pogonochila Diels ex Limpricht

Species of flowering plant

Salvia pogonochila is a perennial plant that is native to the Sichuan province in China, growing in alpine meadows at 3,800 m (12,500 ft) elevation. S. pogonochila grows on ascending stems to 30 to 50 cm (12 to 20 in) tall. The leaves are broadly ovate to triangular-hastate, ranging in size from 2.5 to 8 cm (0.98 to 3.15 in) long and 1.5 to 7 cm (0.59 to 2.76 in) wide. Inflorescences are in raceme-panicles up to 25 cm (9.8 in), with a blue-purple corolla that is 1.4 to 1.8 cm (0.55 to 0.71 in).
