= Salvia potaninii =

Scientific classification
- Kingdom: Plantae
- Clade: Tracheophytes
- Clade: Angiosperms
- Clade: Eudicots
- Clade: Asterids
- Order: Lamiales
- Family: Lamiaceae
- Genus: Salvia
- Species: S. potaninii

Binomial name
- Salvia potaninii Krylov

Species of flowering plant

Salvia potaninii is a herbaceous perennial plant that is native to Sichuan province in China, growing in thickets at 4,000 m (13,000 ft) elevation. It grows 30 to 38 cm (12 to 15 in) high, with leaves that are ovate to oblong-ovate, 3 to 7 cm (1.2 to 2.8 in) long and 1.2 to 5.3 cm (0.47 to 2.09 in) wide. The upper surface of the leaf is covered with fine hairs, with the underside having glandular hairs. The yellowish flowers, 3.5 to 4 cm (1.4 to 1.6 in) long, are on 6 to 10 cm (2.4 to 3.9 in) terminal racemes.
