= Salvia sonchifolia =

Scientific classification
- Kingdom: Plantae
- Clade: Tracheophytes
- Clade: Angiosperms
- Clade: Eudicots
- Clade: Asterids
- Order: Lamiales
- Family: Lamiaceae
- Genus: Salvia
- Species: S. sonchifolia

Binomial name
- Salvia sonchifolia C. Y. Wu

Species of flowering plant

Salvia sonchifolia is a perennial plant that is native to Yunnan province in China, found growing in damp forest humus on limestone mountains at 1,300 to 1,500 m (4,300 to 4,900 ft) elevation. S. sonchifolia grows on erect stems to 30 cm (12 in) tall, with oblong leaves that are 4 to 6.5 cm (1.6 to 2.6 in) long and 1.5 to 3 cm (0.59 to 1.18 in) wide.

Inflorescences are compact 2-flowered verticillasters in terminal racemes, with a 3.5 cm (1.4 in) purple corolla.
