= Salvia subpalmatinervis =

Scientific classification
- Kingdom: Plantae
- Clade: Tracheophytes
- Clade: Angiosperms
- Clade: Eudicots
- Clade: Asterids
- Order: Lamiales
- Family: Lamiaceae
- Genus: Salvia
- Species: S. subpalmatinervis

Binomial name
- Salvia subpalmatinervis E. Peter

Species of flowering plant

Salvia subpalmatinervis is a perennial plant that is native to Yunnan province in China, found growing in thickets, forests, and hilly grasslands at 3,400 to 4,000 m (11,200 to 13,100 ft) elevation. S. subpalmatinervis grows on one to three erect stems to 50 cm (20 in) tall, with mostly basal leaves that are ovate to circular.

Inflorescences are 2–6-flowered verticillasters in terminal racemes that are 10 to 15 cm (3.9 to 5.9 in). The corolla is purplish or blue-purple and 3.5 cm (1.4 in).
