= Salvia atrorubra =

Scientific classification
- Kingdom: Plantae
- Clade: Tracheophytes
- Clade: Angiosperms
- Clade: Eudicots
- Clade: Asterids
- Order: Lamiales
- Family: Lamiaceae
- Genus: Salvia
- Species: S. atrorubra

Binomial name
- Salvia atrorubra C. Y. Wu

Species of flowering plant

Salvia atrorubra is a perennial plant that is native to Yunnan province in China, found growing in forests at 2,700 m (8,900 ft) elevation. S. atrorubra grows on erect stems to 55 cm (22 in) tall, with ovate leaves that are typically 6 to 10.5 cm (2.4 to 4.1 in) long and 4 to 8 cm (1.6 to 3.1 in) wide, sometimes slightly smaller.

Inflorescences are 2-flowered verticillasters in axillary and terminal racemes. The plant has a red corolla that is 3.5 cm (1.4 in).
