= Salvia baimaensis =

Scientific classification
- Kingdom: Plantae
- Clade: Tracheophytes
- Clade: Angiosperms
- Clade: Eudicots
- Clade: Asterids
- Order: Lamiales
- Family: Lamiaceae
- Genus: Salvia
- Species: S. baimaensis

Binomial name
- Salvia baimaensis S. W. Su & Z. A. Shen

Species of flowering plant

Salvia baimaensis (the white horse sage) is a perennial plant that is native to Anhui province in China, growing on hillsides at 600 to 1,400 m (2,000 to 4,600 ft) elevation. S. baimaensis grows on erect stems to a height of 40 to 60 cm (16 to 24 in), with mostly simple leaves. Inflorescences are 6-flowered widely spaced verticillasters in racemes or panicles, with a 1.1 cm (0.43 in) white corolla that is reddish on the middle lobe of the lower lip.
