= Salvia sinica =

Scientific classification
- Kingdom: Plantae
- Clade: Tracheophytes
- Clade: Angiosperms
- Clade: Eudicots
- Clade: Asterids
- Order: Lamiales
- Family: Lamiaceae
- Genus: Salvia
- Species: S. sinica

Binomial name
- Salvia sinica Migo

Species of flowering plant

Salvia sinica is a perennial plant that is native to the hills of Anhui and Zhejiang provinces in China. S. sinica grows on one to a few erect stems to 50 to 100 cm (20 to 39 in) tall, with stem leaves that are narrowly ovate and smaller terminal leaflets that are ovate to oblong-lanceolate. Inflorescences are 5–12 flowered verticillasters in terminal racemes, with a corolla that is tawny, purplish or purple on the upper lip, 1.6 to 2.2 cm (0.63 to 0.87 in).
