= Salvia meiliensis =

Scientific classification
- Kingdom: Plantae
- Clade: Tracheophytes
- Clade: Angiosperms
- Clade: Eudicots
- Clade: Asterids
- Order: Lamiales
- Family: Lamiaceae
- Genus: Salvia
- Species: S. meiliensis

Binomial name
- Salvia meiliensis S. W. Su

Species of flowering plant

Salvia meiliensis (sparking danshen) is a perennial plant that is native to Anhui province in China, found growing on roadsides at 1,000 to 1,300 m (3,300 to 4,300 ft) elevation. S. meiliensis grows on erect stems 30 to 50 cm (12 to 20 in) tall. Inflorescences are widely spaced 8 to many-flowered verticillasters in racemes or panicles, with a yellowish corolla that is 1.5 to 1.6 cm (0.59 to 0.63 in).
