= Salvia breviconnectivata =

Scientific classification
- Kingdom: Plantae
- Clade: Tracheophytes
- Clade: Angiosperms
- Clade: Eudicots
- Clade: Asterids
- Order: Lamiales
- Family: Lamiaceae
- Genus: Salvia
- Species: S. breviconnectivata

Binomial name
- Salvia breviconnectivata Sun

Species of herb

Salvia breviconnectivata is an annual or biennial herb that is native to Yunnan province in China, found growing along roadsides at 1,800 m (5,900 ft) elevation. S. breviconnectivata grows on erect stems to 35 cm (14 in) tall. Inflorescences are 2–6 flowered widely spaced verticillasters in terminal racemes that are 8 to 15 cm (3.1 to 5.9 in), with a reddish corolla that is 1.1 cm (0.43 in).
