= Salvia liguliloba =

Scientific classification
- Kingdom: Plantae
- Clade: Tracheophytes
- Clade: Angiosperms
- Clade: Eudicots
- Clade: Asterids
- Order: Lamiales
- Family: Lamiaceae
- Genus: Salvia
- Species: S. liguliloba

Binomial name
- Salvia liguliloba Sun

Species of herb

Salvia liguliloba is an annual herb that is native to Anhui and Zhejiang provinces in China. It grows on hillside forests at 800 m (2,600 ft) elevation. S. liguliloba grows on purple-green erect stems to a height of 30 to 40 cm (12 to 16 in), occasionally taller. Inflorescences are 2-12 flowered widely spaced verticillasters in terminal racemes, with a 1.8 cm (0.71 in) reddish corolla.
