= Salvia kiangsiensis =

Scientific classification
- Kingdom: Plantae
- Clade: Tracheophytes
- Clade: Angiosperms
- Clade: Eudicots
- Clade: Asterids
- Order: Lamiales
- Family: Lamiaceae
- Genus: Salvia
- Species: S. kiangsiensis

Binomial name
- Salvia kiangsiensis C. Y. Wu

Species of herb

Salvia kiangsiensis is an annual herb that is native to Fujian, Hunan, and Jiangxi provinces in China, growing in valleys and forests. S. kiangsiensis typically reaches a height of 45 cm (18 in), occasionally taller. Inflorescences are 2–6 flowered widely spaced verticillasters in axillary or terminal racemes or panicles, with a 1.2 cm (0.47 in) purple corolla.
