= Salvia dabieshanensis =

Scientific classification
- Kingdom: Plantae
- Clade: Tracheophytes
- Clade: Angiosperms
- Clade: Eudicots
- Clade: Asterids
- Order: Lamiales
- Family: Lamiaceae
- Genus: Salvia
- Species: S. dabieshanensis

Binomial name
- Salvia dabieshanensis J. Q. He

Species of flowering plant

Salvia dabieshanensis is a perennial plant that is native to Anhui province in China, found growing on hillsides and near thickets at 600 to 1,100 m (2,000 to 3,600 ft) elevation. S. dabieshanensis typically grows on a single erect stem to 1 m (3.3 ft) tall. The corolla is yellow or yellowish, from 2 to 2.8 cm (0.79 to 1.10 in) long.
