= Salvia chunganensis =

Scientific classification
- Kingdom: Plantae
- Clade: Tracheophytes
- Clade: Angiosperms
- Clade: Eudicots
- Clade: Asterids
- Order: Lamiales
- Family: Lamiaceae
- Genus: Salvia
- Species: S. chunganensis

Binomial name
- Salvia chunganensis C. Y. Wu & Y. C. Huang

Species of herb

Salvia chunganensis is an annual herb that is native to Fujian province in China, typically growing in tufts of grass. S. chunganensis grows on erect stems to a height of 32 to 44 cm (13 to 17 in). Inflorescences are 2–6 flowered verticillasters in racemes or panicles, with a 9 to 10 mm (0.35 to 0.39 in) purplish blue or reddish white corolla.
