= Salvia stolonifera =

Scientific classification
- Kingdom: Plantae
- Clade: Tracheophytes
- Clade: Angiosperms
- Clade: Eudicots
- Clade: Asterids
- Order: Lamiales
- Family: Lamiaceae
- Genus: Salvia
- Species: S. stolonifera

Binomial name
- Salvia stolonifera Benth.

Species of plant

Salvia stolonifera, the creeping Mexican sage, is a species of flowering plant in the family Lamiaceae. It is native to Guerrero and Oaxaca in Mexico. A clump-forming perennial reaching 0.5 m (2 ft), it has fragrant leaves and bears its reddish-orange flowers on erect spikes. Available from commercial suppliers, it has gained the Royal Horticultural Society's Award of Garden Merit.
