= Salvia adoxoides =

Scientific classification
- Kingdom: Plantae
- Clade: Tracheophytes
- Clade: Angiosperms
- Clade: Eudicots
- Clade: Asterids
- Order: Lamiales
- Family: Lamiaceae
- Genus: Salvia
- Species: S. adoxoides

Binomial name
- Salvia adoxoides C. Y. Wu

Species of flowering plant

Salvia adoxoides is a perennial plant that is native to Guangxi province in China, found growing in hillside fields at 200 m (660 ft) elevation. S. adoxoides grows on red stems to a height of 11 cm (4.3 in), with mostly basal leaves. Inflorescences are 2-flowered widely spaced verticillasters in racemes, with a 9 mm (0.35 in) white corolla.
