= Salvia qimenensis =

Scientific classification
- Kingdom: Plantae
- Clade: Tracheophytes
- Clade: Angiosperms
- Clade: Eudicots
- Clade: Asterids
- Order: Lamiales
- Family: Lamiaceae
- Genus: Salvia
- Species: S. qimenensis

Binomial name
- Salvia qimenensis S. W. Su & J. Q. He

Species of herb

Salvia qimenensis is a perennial or biennial herb that is native to Anhui province in China, typically growing on hillsides. S. qimenensis grows on erect stems to a height of 40 to 60 cm (16 to 24 in). Inflorescences are 6-flowered widely spaced verticillasters in racemes or panicles, with a 1.5 cm (0.59 in) purple to white corolla.
