= Salvia 'Jean's Purple Passion' =

Plant cultivar

- Hybrid parentage: S. gesneriflora × S. mexicana, see text.
- Cultivar: 'Jean's Purple Passion'
- Origin: California

Salvia 'Jean's Purple Passion' is a Salvia cultivar discovered at Cabrillo College in Aptos, California. It was found growing between Salvia gesneriflora 'Tequila' and Salvia mexicana, who are presumed to be its parents. It is named for Jean Coria, a gardening enthusiast who propagated many species in the genus Salvia for many years at Strybing Arboretum.

It has large, vibrant violet flowers and grows 6 ft (1.8 m) or more in height. Its preference for humid cool conditions indicates parents that are from cloud forest conditions.
