= Salvia grandiflora =

Salvia grandiflora can refer to the following plant species:

- Salvia grandiflora Etl., a synonym of Salvia tomentosa Mill.
- Salvia grandiflora Née ex Cav., a synonym of Salvia patens Cav.
- Salvia grandiflora Sessé & Moc. (1887), a synonym of Salvia fulgens Cav.
- Salvia grandiflora Sessé & Moc. (1893), a synonym of Salvia gesneriflora Lindl. & Paxton
- Salvia grandiflora Ten., a synonym of Salvia officinalis L. subsp. officinalis
