= Salvia × jamensis =

Scientific classification
- Kingdom: Plantae
- Clade: Tracheophytes
- Clade: Angiosperms
- Clade: Eudicots
- Clade: Asterids
- Order: Lamiales
- Family: Lamiaceae
- Genus: Salvia
- Species: S. × jamensis

Binomial name
- Salvia × jamensis J.Compton

Hybrid species of flowering plant

Salvia × jamensis (Salvia greggii × Salvia microphylla) is a perennial shrub or sub-shrub in the Lamiaceae family. It is a hybrid of Salvia greggii and Salvia microphylla. Salvia × jamensis consists of both naturally occurring hybrids and cultivars. Flowers can be white, red, yellow, purple, pink, cream, or a bi-color flower consisting of a combination of two of the aforementioned colors. The naturally occurring populations of Salvia × jamensis are native to northeastern Mexico and are most prevalent where the ranges of Salvia greggii and Salvia microphylla overlap in the Sierra Madre Occidental in Coahuila and San Luis Potosí at elevations between 6,500 and 9,800 feet.

== Taxonomy ==
Salvia × jamensis was first described and named by English botanist James A. Compton after he collected plant material near the village of Jamé in the Mexican state of Coahuila in 1991, though it had been in cultivation prior to its current naming as early as 1988 by Carl Schoenfeld and John Fairey of Yucca do Nursery.

Because Salvia greggii and Salvia microphylla hybridize readily, it can be difficult to distinguish between Salvia × jamensis, a hybrid of the two aforementioned species, and those species, respectively. S. greggii tends to have larger, ovate leaves while S. microphylla tends to have smaller leaves with serrate margins. These characteristics can vary based on environmental factors.

== Horticulture ==
Salvia × jamensis is a popular ornamental plant and a nectar source for pollinators including hummingbirds, bees, and butterflies. It is often cultivated in the U.S. states of California, Texas, Nevada, and Arizona, as well as in Mexico. Much like Salvia greggii and Salvia microphylla, the plants which comprise its parentage, it prefers full sun or partial shade. Full sun is often preferred in coastal settings, whereas partial shade is preferred in hotter inland conditions. It can tolerate sand, loam, or clay soil, though, in a garden setting, irrigation should be adjusted depending on soil drainage conditions. Salvia × jamensis requires little watering after establishment in most conditions but can benefit from an occasional deep watering. It is considered to be a drought-tolerant plant. Spent flowers can be deadheaded to encourage reblooming. Pruning by roughly one-third to two-thirds of the overall plant's size prior to its new growth season can improve structure and increase the frequency of blooms.

=== Example varieties ===
- Salvia × jamensis 'Sierra de San Antonio'
- Salvia × jamensis 'California Sunset'
- Salvia × jamensis 'La Luna'
- Salvia × jamensis 'Heatwave Glimmer'
- Salvia × jamensis 'Heatwave Blaze'
- Salvia × jamensis 'Heatwave Brilliance'
