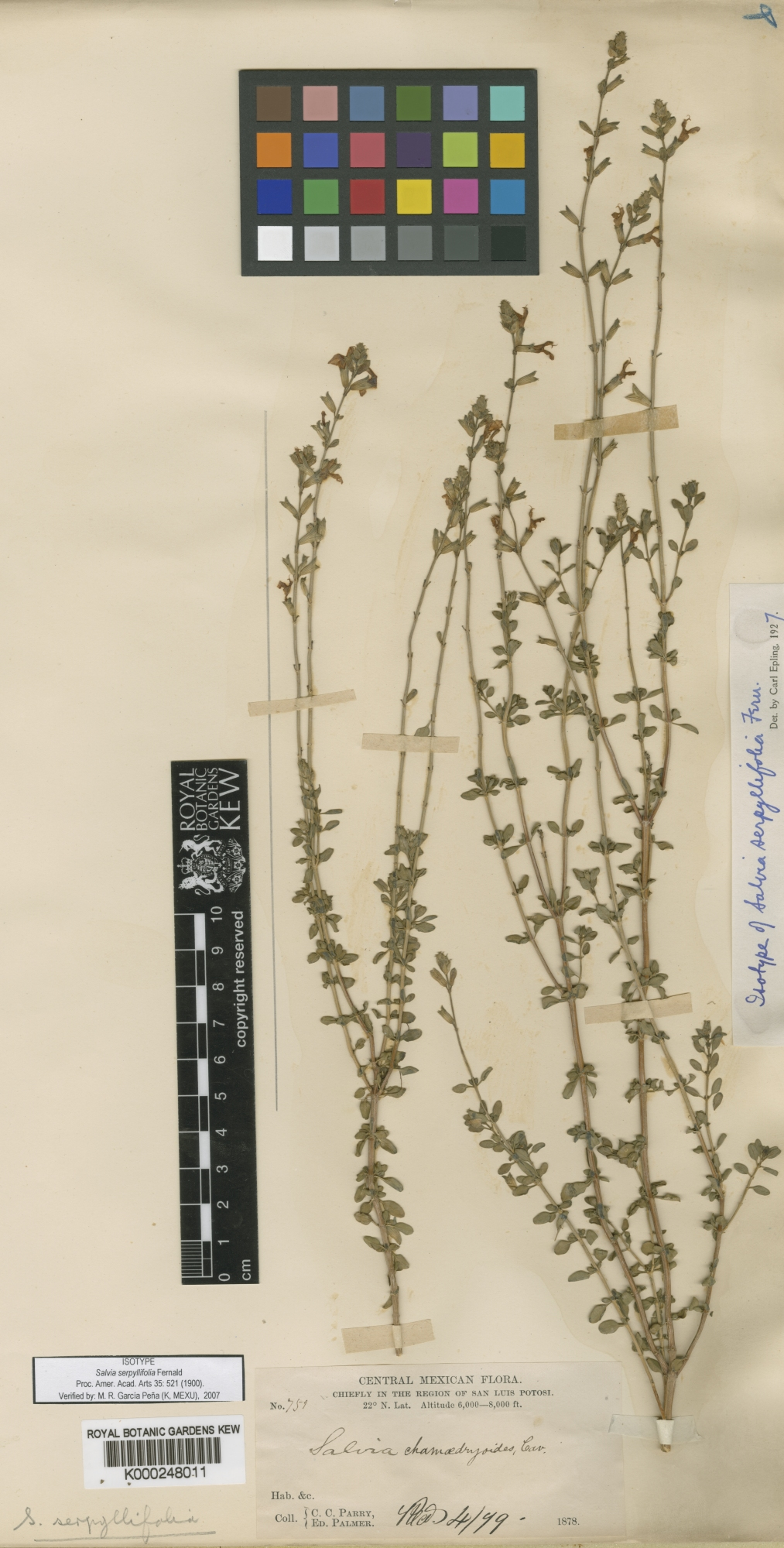

Scientific classification
- Kingdom: Plantae
- Clade: Tracheophytes
- Clade: Angiosperms
- Clade: Eudicots
- Clade: Asterids
- Order: Lamiales
- Family: Lamiaceae
- Genus: Salvia
- Species: S. serpyllifolia

Binomial name
- Salvia serpyllifolia Fernald

= Salvia serpyllifolia =

Species of flowering plant

Salvia serpyllifolia is a woody perennial endemic to a small area in the Mexican state of San Luis Potosi. It was described by Merritt Lyndon Fernald in 1900, who gave it the epithet serpyllifolia because of its small, shiny leaves—similar to the leaves of Thymus serpyllum. Salvia serpyllifolia was introduced into horticulture in 1990 from seed collected at 7,000 feet elevation. At that time it was thought to be a variety of Salvia microphylla.

Salvia serpyllifolia is a small mounding plant that reaches 2 feet (0.61 m) high and 3 feet (0.91 m) wide. The 0.5-inch (13 mm) leaves are a bright glossy green which give off a faint straw-like aroma when crushed. The flowers are less than 0.7 inches (18 mm) long and are a beetroot-purple color, blooming sporadically from summer into fall. The whorls consist of 2–6 flowers each.
