= Mexican sage =

Mexican sage is a common name for several plants and may refer to:

- Salvia leucantha, native to central and eastern Mexico
- Salvia longistyla
- Salvia mexicana, native to Mexico
