= S. mexicana =

S. mexicana may refer to:

- Sabal mexicana, the Mexican palmetto, Texas palmetto, Texas sabal Palm, Rio Grande palmetto or palma de Mícharos, a palm tree species native to North America
- Salvia mexicana, the Mexican sage, a herbaceous shrubby perennial species native to a wide area of central Mexico

== See also ==
- Mexicana (disambiguation)
