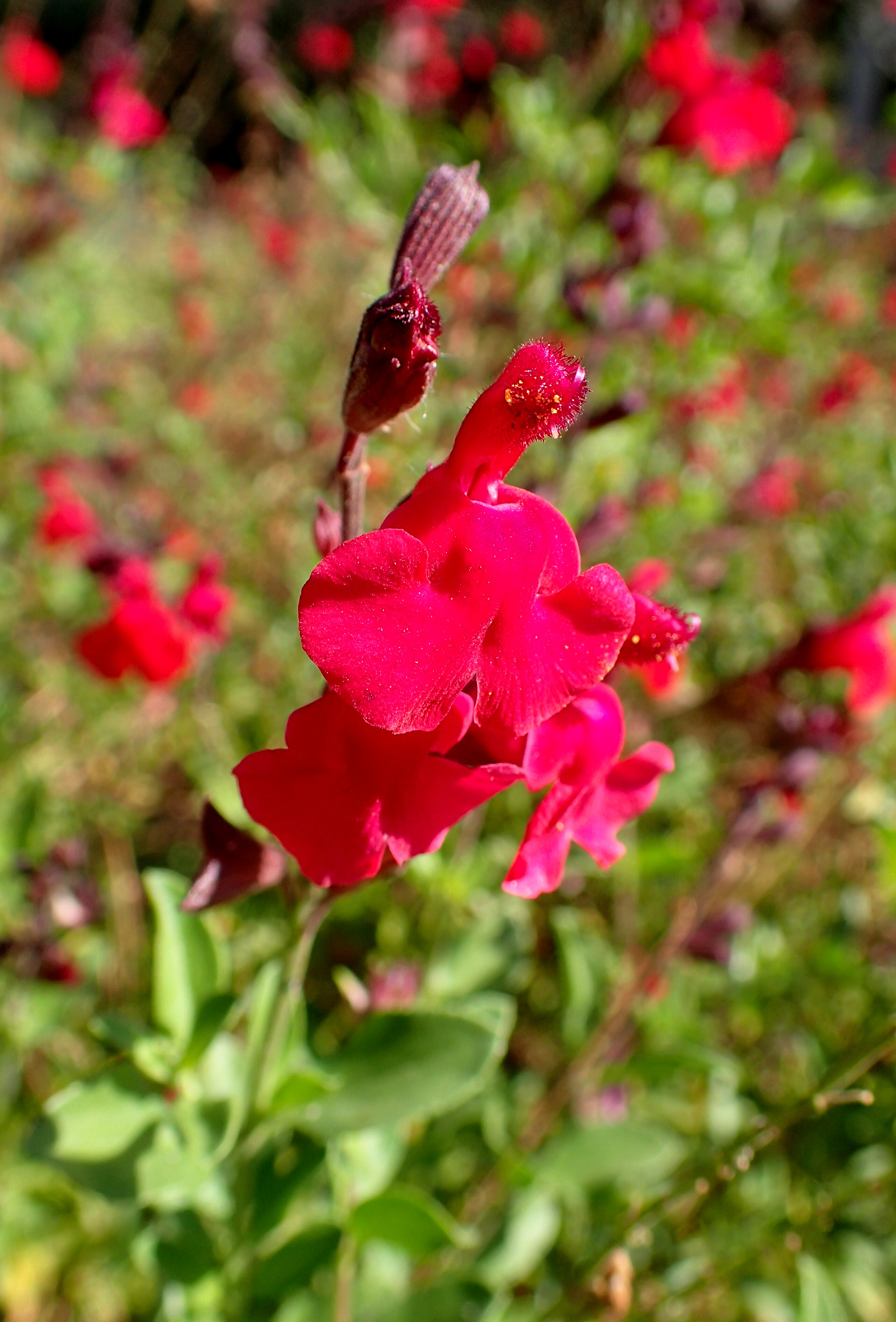

Scientific classification
- Kingdom: Plantae
- Clade: Tracheophytes
- Clade: Angiosperms
- Clade: Eudicots
- Clade: Asterids
- Order: Lamiales
- Family: Lamiaceae
- Genus: Salvia
- Species: S. greggii

Binomial name
- Salvia greggii A.Gray

= Salvia greggii =

Species of flowering plant

Salvia greggii, the autumn sage, is a herbaceous perennial plant native to a long, narrow area from southwest Texas, through the Chihuahuan Desert and into the Mexican state of San Luis Potosi, typically growing in rocky soils at elevations from 5,000 to 9,000 ft (1,500 to 2,700 m). It was named and described in 1870 by botanist Asa Gray after Josiah Gregg (1806–1850), a merchant, explorer, naturalist, and author from the American Southwest and Northern Mexico, who found and collected the plant in Texas. It is closely related to, and frequently hybridizes with, Salvia microphylla. Despite the common name "autumn sage", it blooms throughout the summer and autumn.

== Description ==
Salvia greggii is a highly variable plant, with numerous named cultivars, reaching anywhere from 1 to 4 ft (0.30 to 1.22 m) in height and less in width. It can be either upright or mounding. The leaves are typically mid-green and glabrous, tending to be less than 1 in (2.5 cm) long, and with a spicy fragrance. Flower size and color are extremely variable. Flowers reach from .25 to 1 in (0.64 to 2.54 cm) in length, and include many shades of scarlet and red (most common in the wild), along with rose, white, pink, lavender, apricot, and violet.

== Cultivation ==
The plant is used widely in horticulture. Popular named cultivars include 'Furman's Red', a cultivar from Texas that blooms profusely in autumn with dark red flowers. 'Big Pink' has a large lower lip with a deep pink color and lavender tint. 'Purple Pastel' is a small variety that repeat blooms in autumn. 'Cherry Chief 'blooms reliably in the humid southern United States. 'Desert Pastel' has pale apricot flowers with yellow streaks, and prefers mild climates. Other cultivars include: 'Alba', a white flowered variety; 'Peach', with vivid red flowers; 'Strawberries and Cream', yellow and pink.

Natural hybrids between S. greggii and S. microphylla were discovered in Mexico in 1991 by an English plant expedition. The variously colored hybrids are collectively named Salvia × jamensis after the nearest village, Jame. The collectors gathered seed from nearly 30 different colors of flowers. It was later discovered that plants collected in 1991 by collectors from Yucca Do Nursery in Texas were also forms of Salvia × jamensis. The various forms most resemble S. greggii in height, though they show a range of variety in other traits. In the UK the cultivars 'Javier' and 'Peter Vidgeon' have gained the Royal Horticultural Society's Award of Garden Merit.

Other species have been involved in the production of garden cultivars, and the precise origin of some is unclear. As a group, they may be referred to as Mexican salvias.

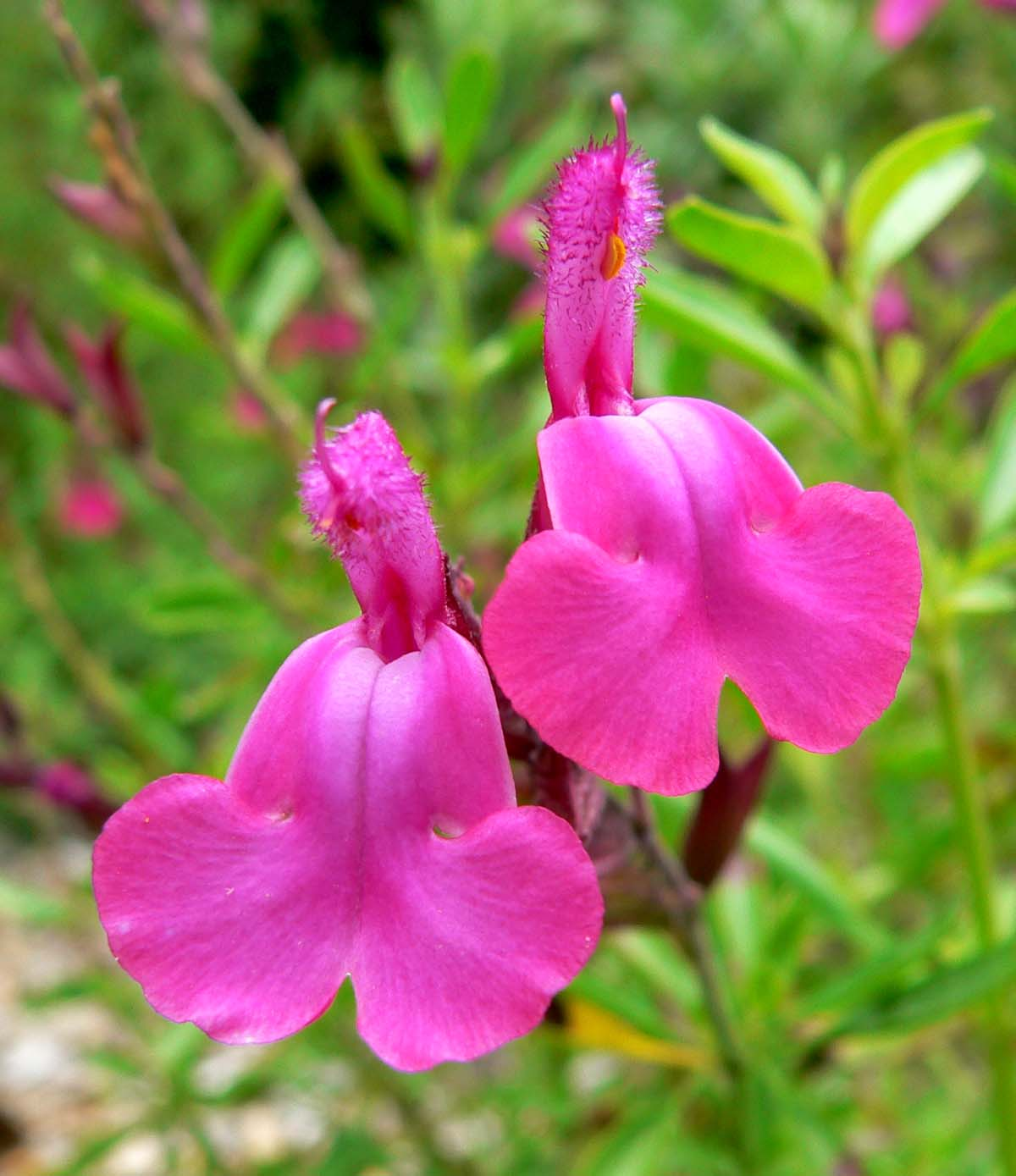
'Coronado Pink'

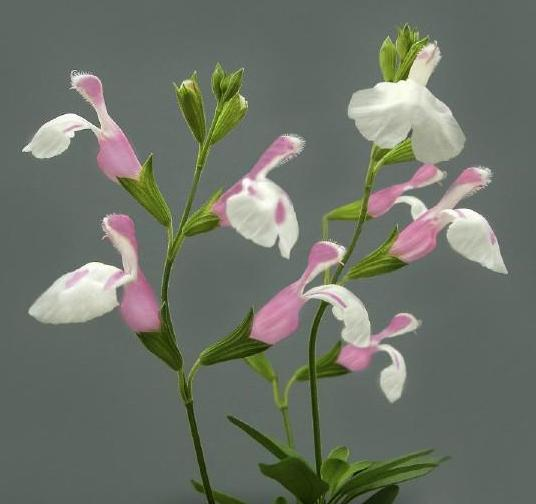
'Teresa'
