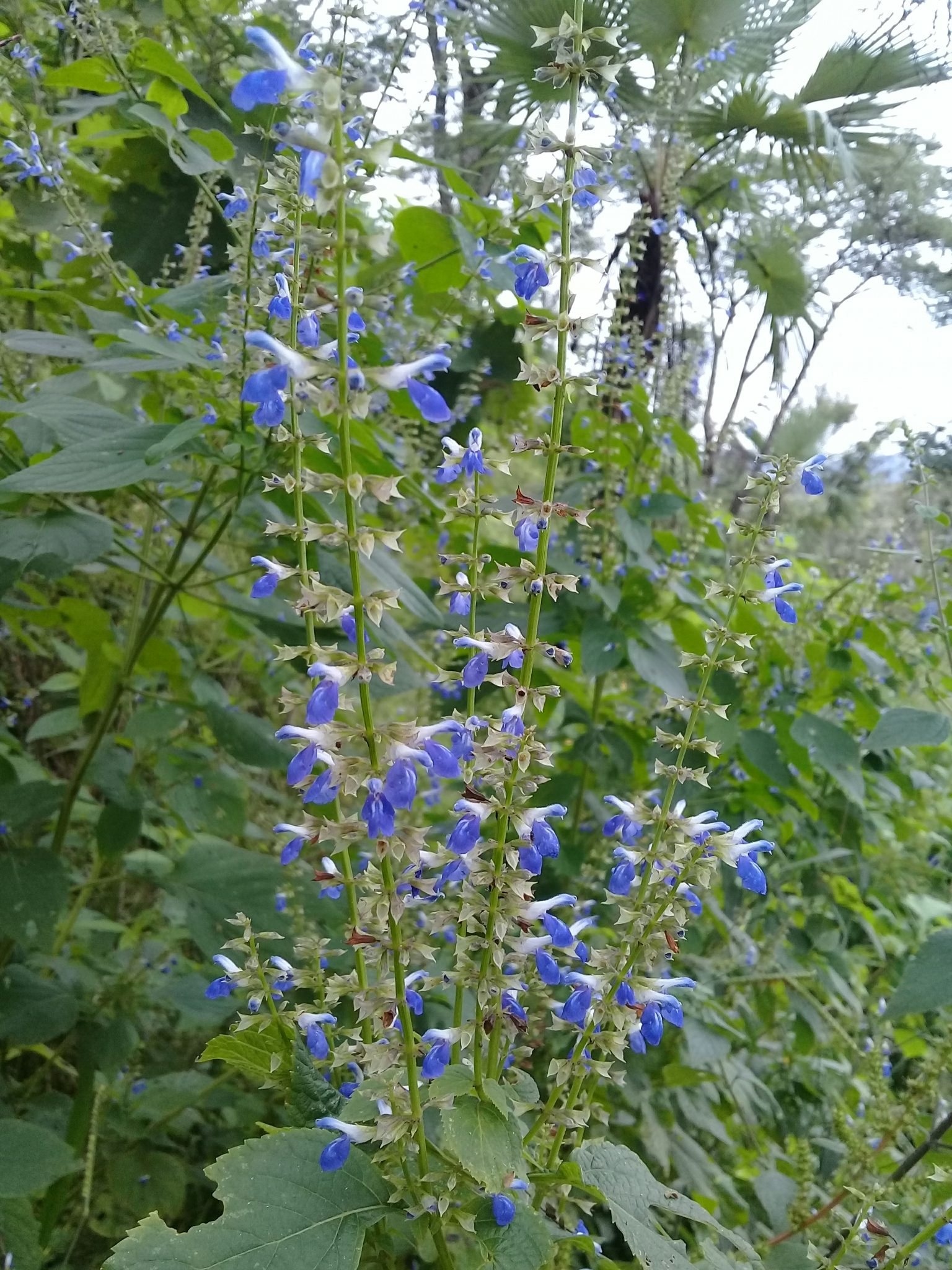

Scientific classification
- Kingdom: Plantae
- Clade: Tracheophytes
- Clade: Angiosperms
- Clade: Eudicots
- Clade: Asterids
- Order: Lamiales
- Family: Lamiaceae
- Genus: Salvia
- Species: S. longispicata

Binomial name
- Salvia longispicata M.Martens & Galeotti

= Salvia longispicata =

Species of shrub

Salvia longispicata is a perennial shrub native to southwestern Mexico, growing between 1,000 and 6,500 feet (300 and 2,000 m) elevation. The specific epithet "longispicata" gives the impression that the plant has "long spikes", but instead refers to the many projecting clusters of short flowering spikes that resemble small ears of corn.

Salvia longispicata is a large, fast growing Salvia, reaching 4 to 5 feet (1.2 to 1.5 m) high and 3 to 4 feet (0.9 to 1.2 m) wide in one season. While not particularly showy, it has unusual dark purple flowers and an upright habit—both qualities are valued by salvia hybridizers. The mid-green ovate leaves are many sizes, and connected to the petiole at the broader end. Small - less than 0.5 inches (1 cm) - dark purple flowers begin appearing in summer and bloom into late autumn. The pale green calyces are about the same length as the flower. The 6 to 8 inches (15 to 20 cm) inflorescences have tight whorls of flowers, which do not rise above the foliage as many other species of Salvia do.

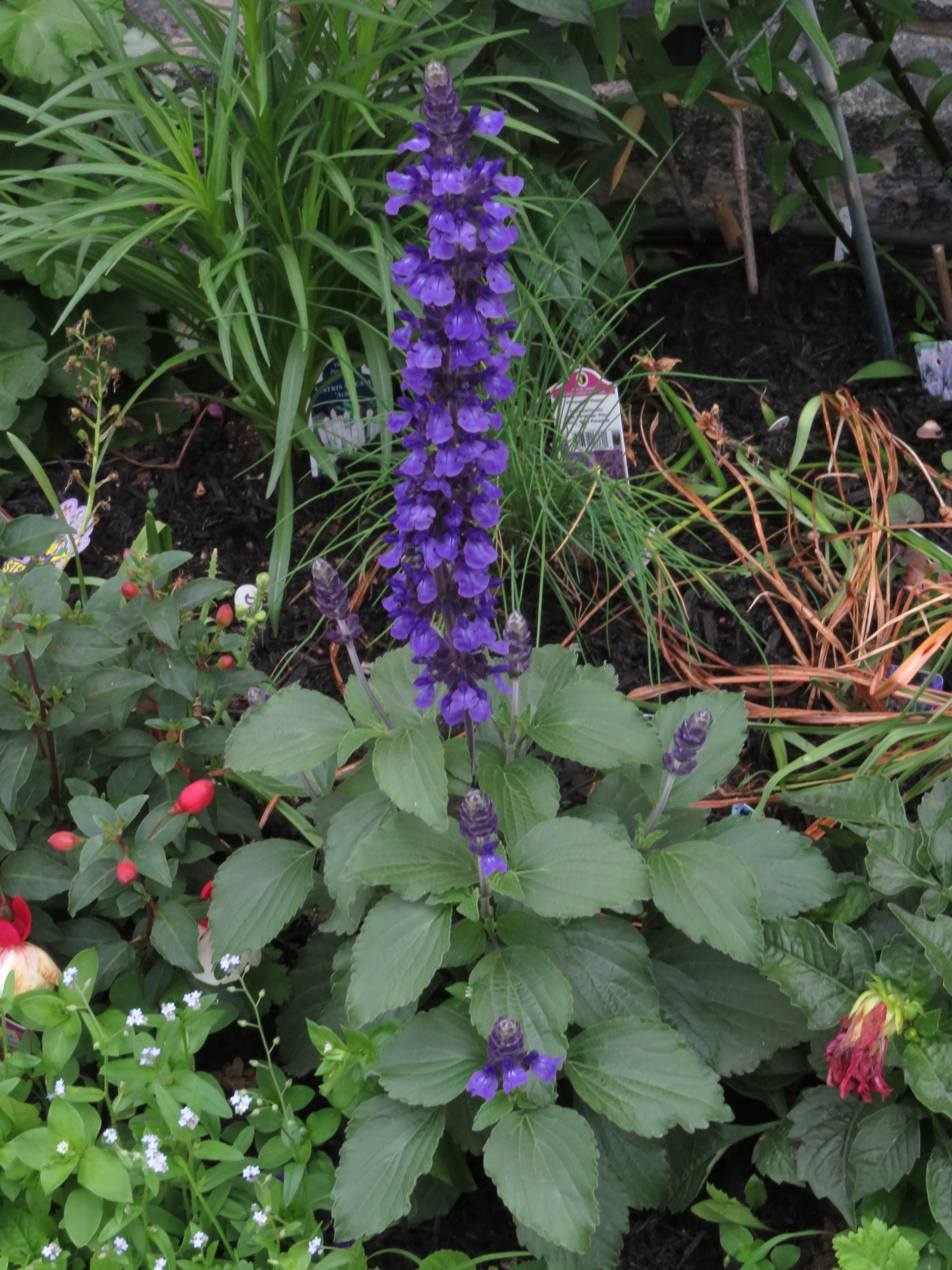
Salvia farinacea x Salvia longispicata "Mystic Spires Blue'

In 1979 a spontaneous sterile hybrid was found at Huntington Library that was believed to be from a cross between Salvia longispicata and S. farinacea. It was introduced as the highly popular Salvia farinacea × longispicata 'Indigo Spires'. Other cultivars of this hybrid include 'Mystic Spires Blue'.
