= Salvia 'Indigo Spires' =

Hybrid plant

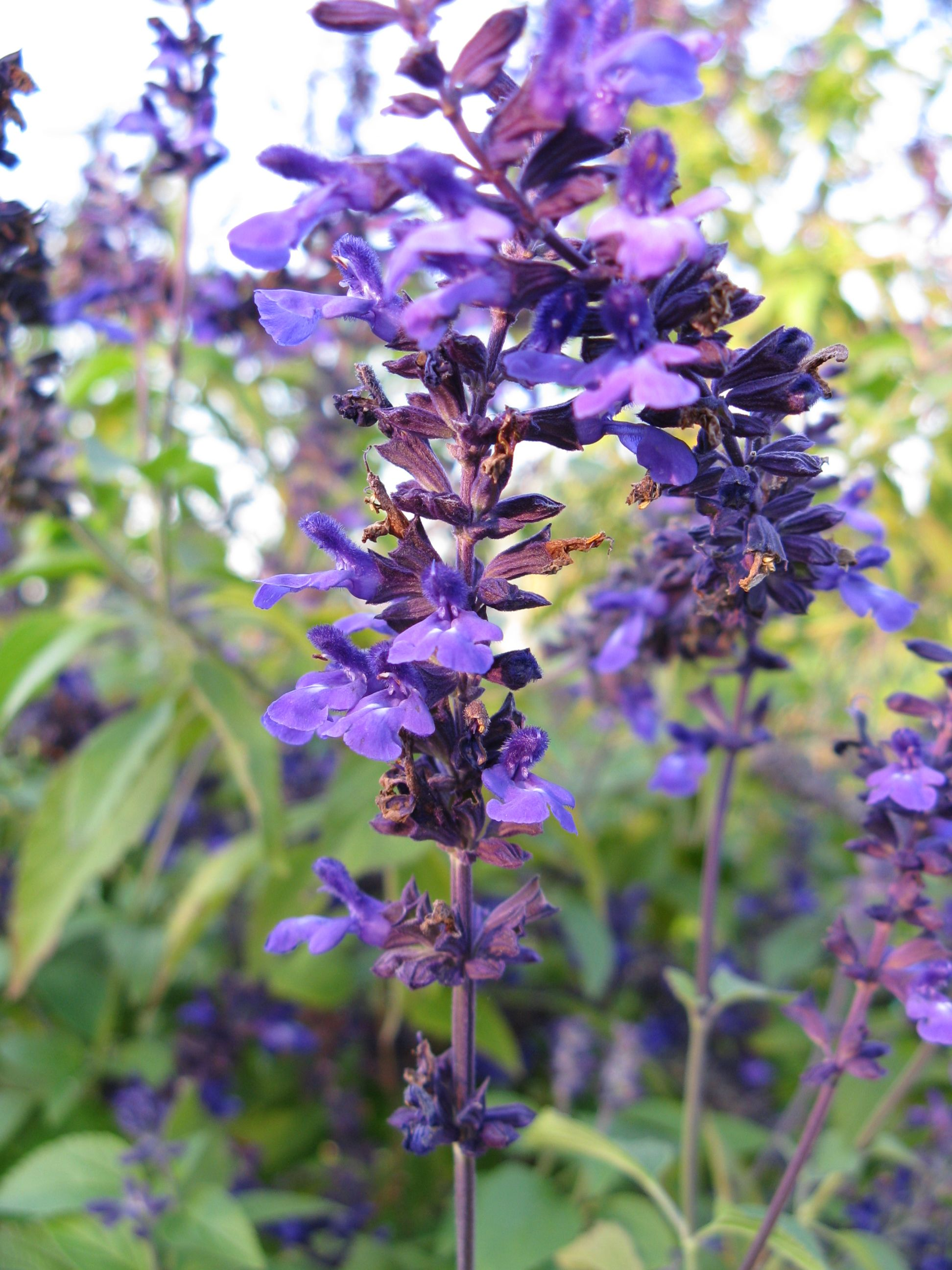
- Genus: Salvia
- Hybrid parentage: S. longispicata × S. farinacea
- Cultivar: 'Indigo Spires'

Salvia 'Indigo Spires' is a hybrid cross between S. longispicata and S. farinacea. It was a chance discovery at Huntington Botanical Gardens, found growing near the two presumed parents, S. longispicata and S. farinacea. Introduced into horticulture in 1979, and has become a very popular bedding plant.

The spike-like inflorescences reach 25 to 30 cm (9.8 to 11.8 in), blooming from early summer to frost, with small (1.3 cm (0.51 in)) rich violet flowers that are very tightly packed in whorls. The 1.3 cm (0.51 in) calyx is purple, staying long after the flower falls off.
