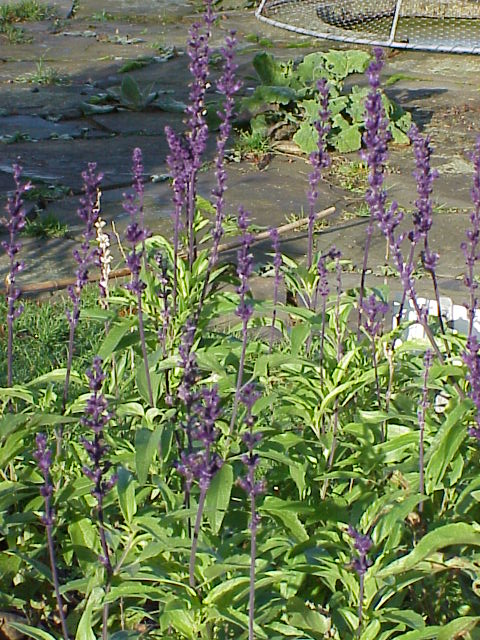

Conservation status
- Secure (NatureServe)

Scientific classification
- Kingdom: Plantae
- Clade: Tracheophytes
- Clade: Angiosperms
- Clade: Eudicots
- Clade: Asterids
- Order: Lamiales
- Family: Lamiaceae
- Genus: Salvia
- Species: S. farinacea

Binomial name
- Salvia farinacea Benth.

Synonyms
- Salvia earlei Wooton & Standl. Salvia linearis Sessé & Moc. Salvia virgata Ortega.

= Salvia farinacea =

Species of flowering plant

Salvia farinacea, the mealycup sage, or mealy sage, is a herbaceous perennial native to Nuevo León, Mexico and parts of the United States including Texas and Oklahoma. Violet-blue spikes rest on a compact plant of typically narrow salvia-like leaves; however, the shiny leaves are what set this species apart from most other Salvia, which bear velvety-dull leaves.

== Description ==
The mealycup sage reaches stature heights of 60 to 90 cm. The shape of the leaf blade varies from ovate-lanceolate to lanceolate. The inflorescence axis forms a blue, rarely a white hair. The truncated calyx has very short calyx teeth. They are dense blue or white hairy, so that the individual enamel teeth are barely recognisable. The bright blue-white flowers are slim and gleaming. The crown will be about 2.5 inches long. Inside the crown there is no ring-shaped hair strip.

The first description of S. farinacea was made in 1833 by George Bentham in Labiatarum Genera et Species, p. 274. Synonyms for S. farinacea Benth. include Salvia linearis Sessé & Moc. and S. virgata Ortega.

== Cultivation ==
This plant requires full or partial sun and will grow to 18 inches or more with good soil and will attract bees, butterflies and hummingbirds. The plant is hardy to USDA Hardiness Zones 8–10. Many varieties are frequently reported to be hardy to zone 7 when well sited and left to stand over winter, waiting to cut back until late winter or early spring. Longispicata x farinacea hybrids are often reliably hardy to zone 7. The plant flowers from June to frost, or as early as April for mature clumps. In the southern US it can make a stunning, long lived specimen as a solitary plant or en masse. In the temperate latitudes, it is cultivated as an annual plant and used as an ornamental plant in parks and gardens, especially in summer discounts. It can also be used as a cut flower.

Several cultivars are cultivated, such as 'Blue Bedder', 'Victoria' with intense violet-blue flowers and 'Strata' with white and blue flowers. Crosses between S. farinacea and S. longispicata (S. longispicata × S. farinacea) are widely sold as ornamental plants, such as 'Indigo Spires' and 'Mystic Spires Blue'.

== Cultivars ==
- S. farinacea 'Blue Bedder',1847 seed variety still in common use as of 2025.
- S. farinacea 'Victoria', common cutflower seed variety. Also sold as Victoria Blue and Blue Victory.
- S. farinacea 'Rhea', purple seeded variety patented by Muller Seeds.
- S. farinacea 'Strata', white calyces and sparse purple flowers seeded variety patented by Muller Seeds.
- S. farinacea 'Cirrus', white seeded variety patented by Muller Seeds.
- S. farinacea ‘Midnight Candle’
- S. farinacea ‘Rebel Child’
- S. farinacea ‘Fairy Queen’, lavender and white
- S. farinacea 'Henry Duelberg', popular vegetative, larger and well-branched texas variety. Suspected hybrid of unknown origin. Leaves resemble S. Guaranitica.
- S. farinacea 'Augusta Duelberg’
- S. farinacea ‘Evolution’ violet, All American Selection seed variety
- S. farinacea ‘Evolution’ white, seed variety
- S. farinacea ‘Velocity Blue’, vegetative variety
- S. farinacea ‘Unplugged So Blue’, vegetative variety
- S. farinacea ‘Sallyfun’ series, vegetative varieties in multiple colors for containers
- S. farinacea ‘Cathedral’ series, vegetative varieties in multiple colors for containers
- Salvia Indigo Spires (S. longispicata × S. farinacea allegedly), 1979 chance hybrid found in Huntington Botanical Gardens, San Marino, California
- Salvia Big Blue (S. longispicata × S. farinacea), seed variety. Same cross as Indigo Spires but more compact and later flowering.
- Salvia Mystic Spires Blue (S. longispicata × S. farinacea) ‘balsalmisp’ patent owned by Ball Seed. Intentional sport of Indigo Spires. Current patent is for the second generation of this cultivar, previously named Mystic Spires Improved. Also sold under trademark Salvia Rockin’ Playin’ the Blues.
- Salvia Mysty (S. longispicata × S. farinacea) intentional sport of Mystic Spires
- Salvia Blue Chill (S. longispicata × S. farinacea) light blue flowers with white mottling reminiscent of nepeta faassenii and grandiflora cultivars

== Gallery ==
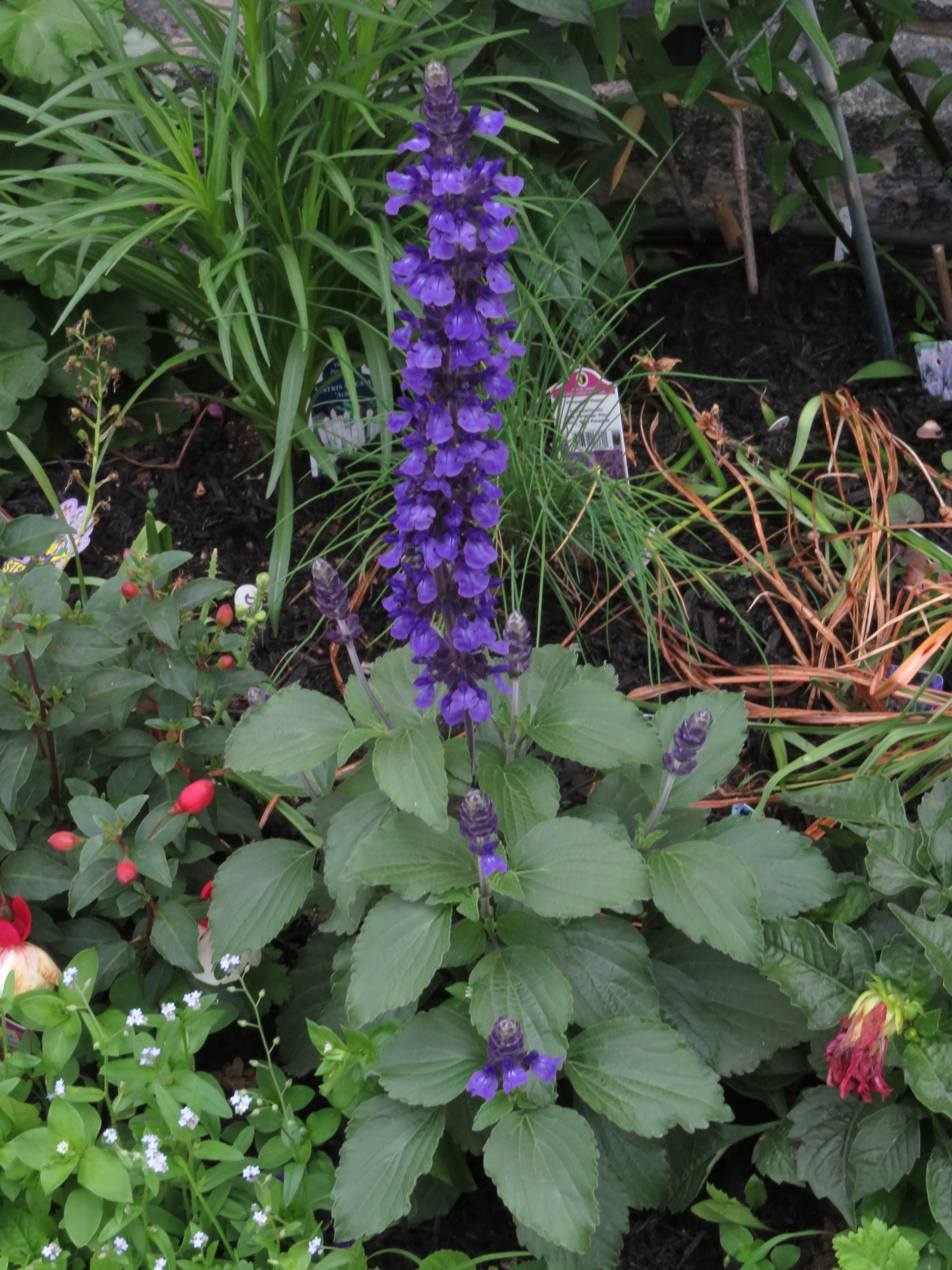
Salvia farinacea x Salvia longispicata "Mystic Spires Blue'

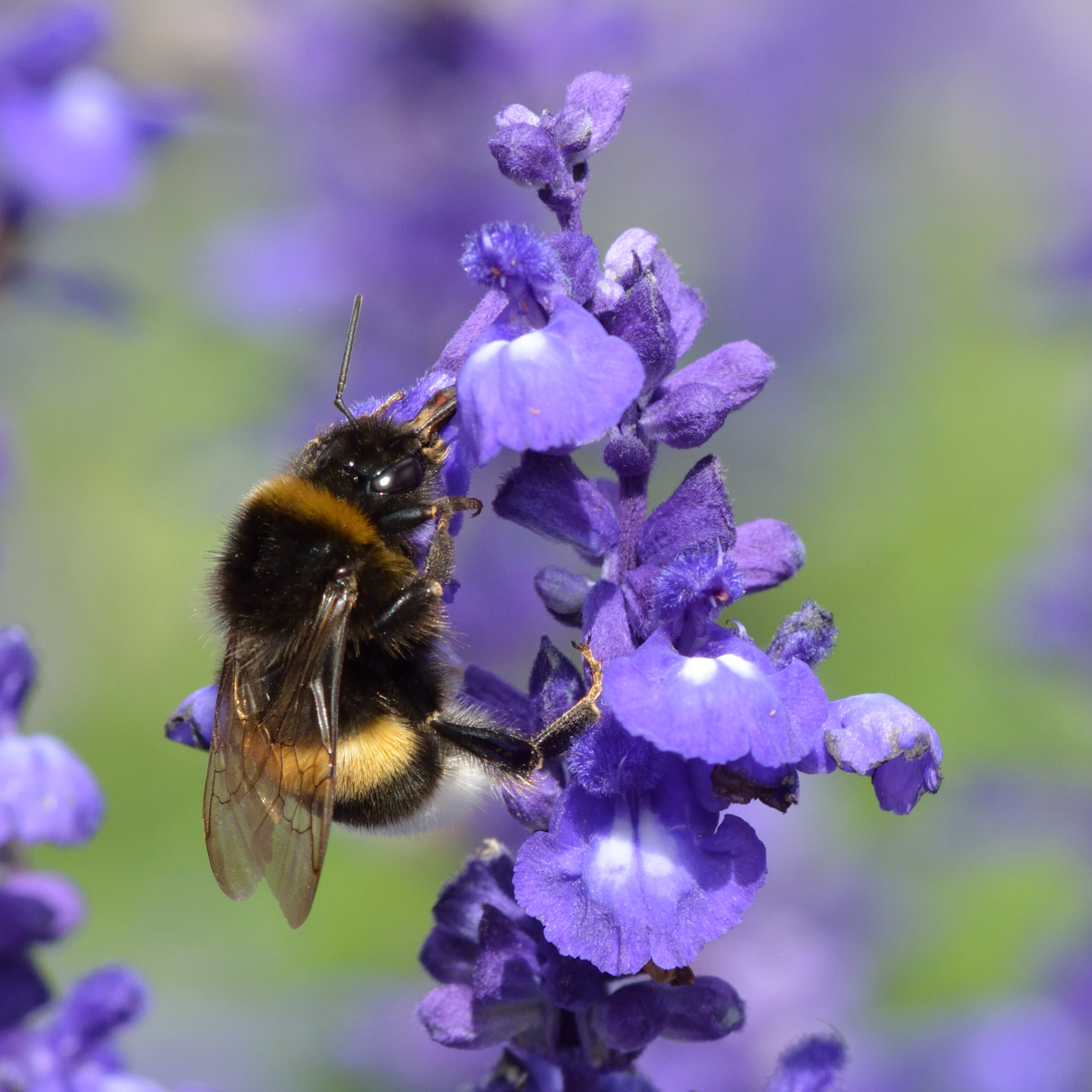
Bumblebees are very attracted to mealycup sage cultivars

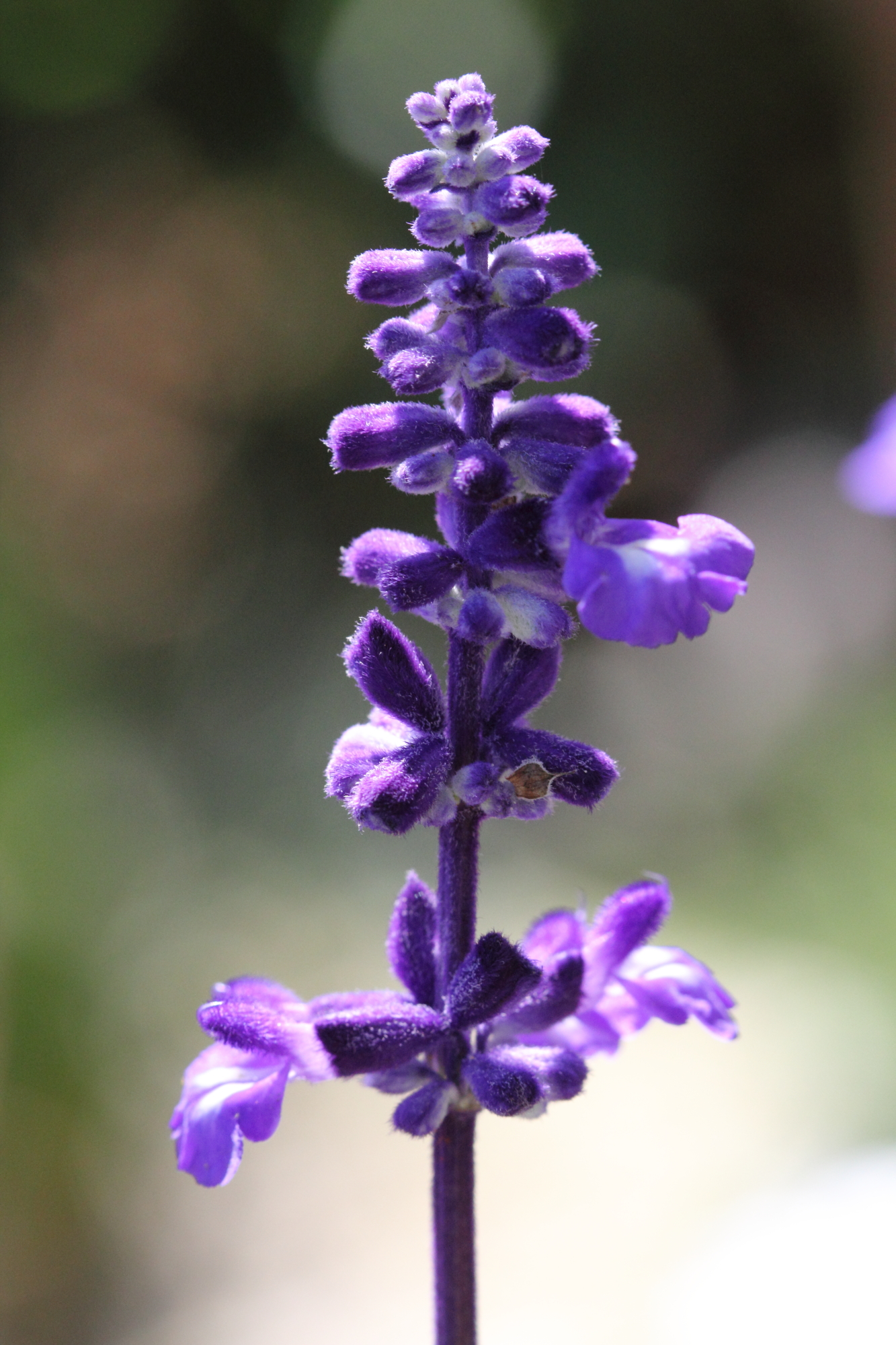
Inflorescence

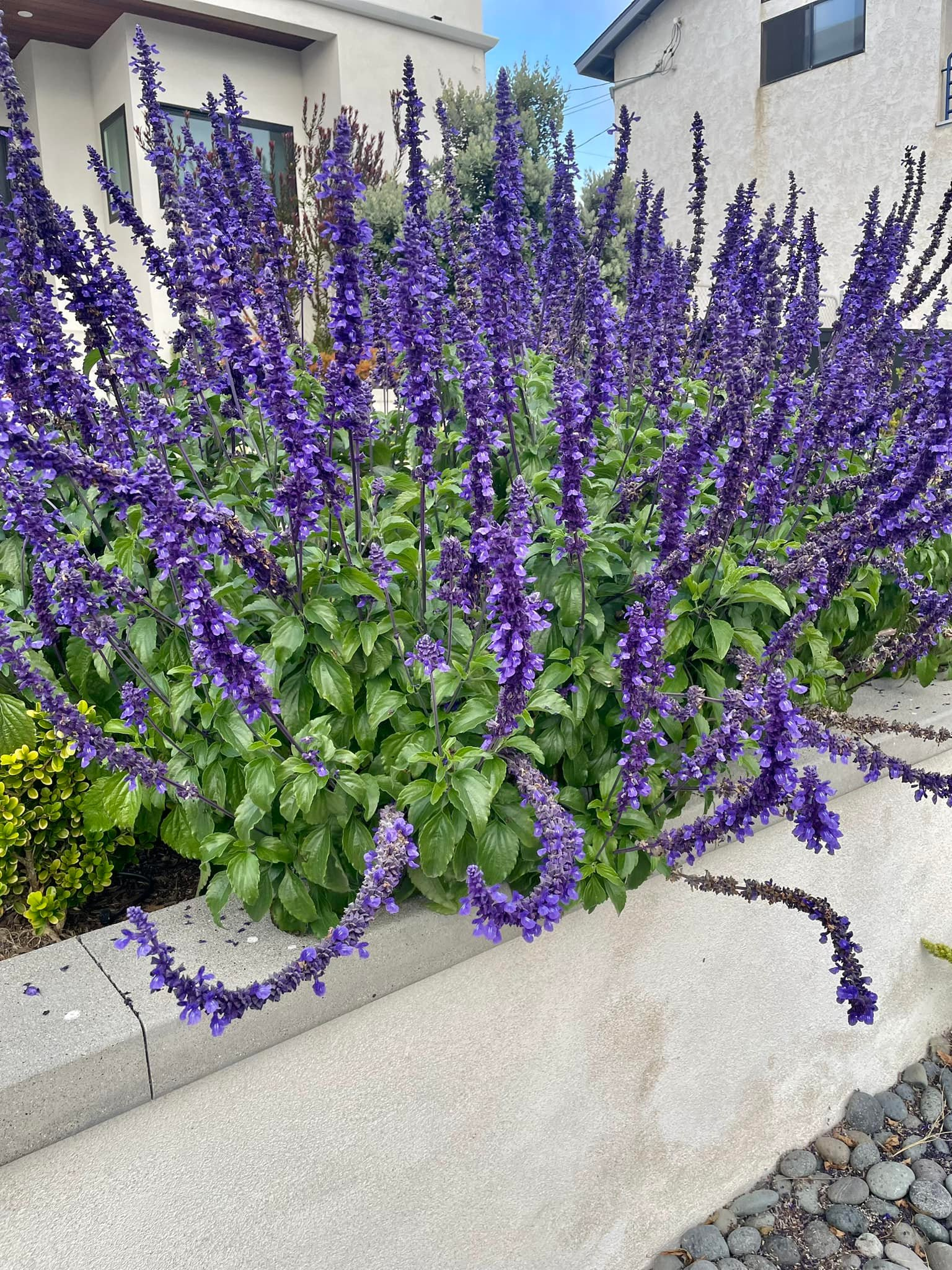
Sequential blooming

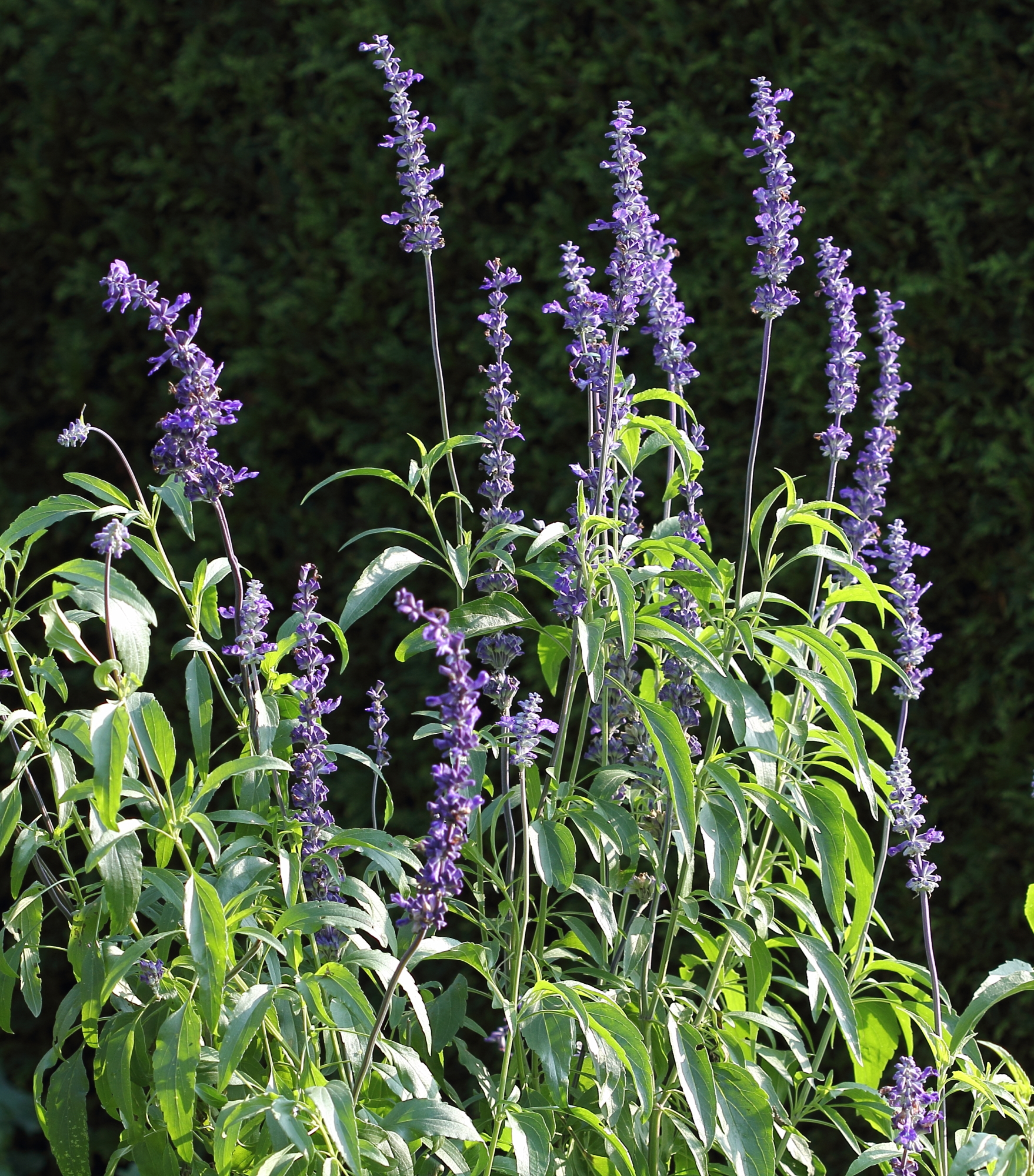
Natural habitat

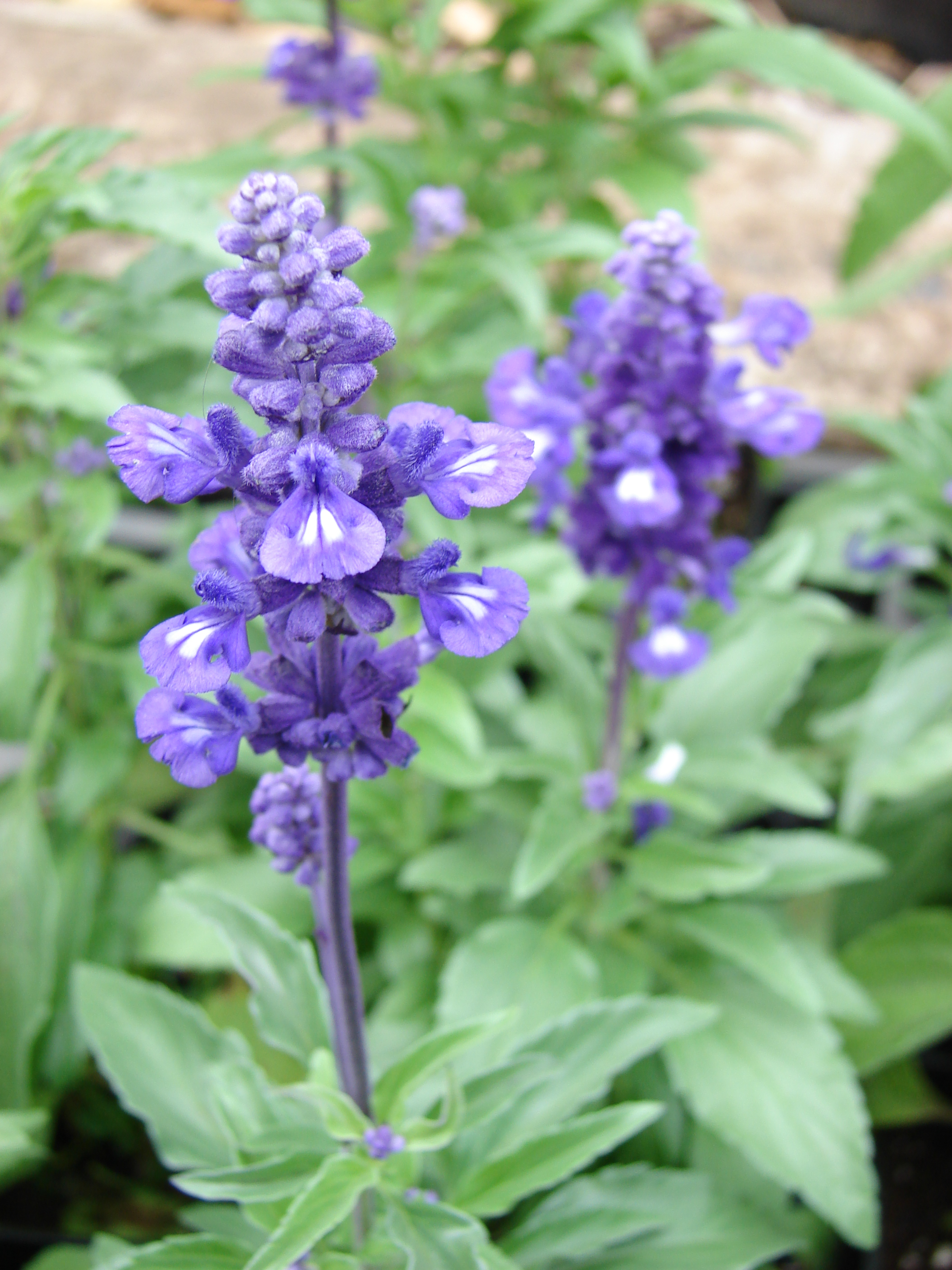
Leaves and flowers

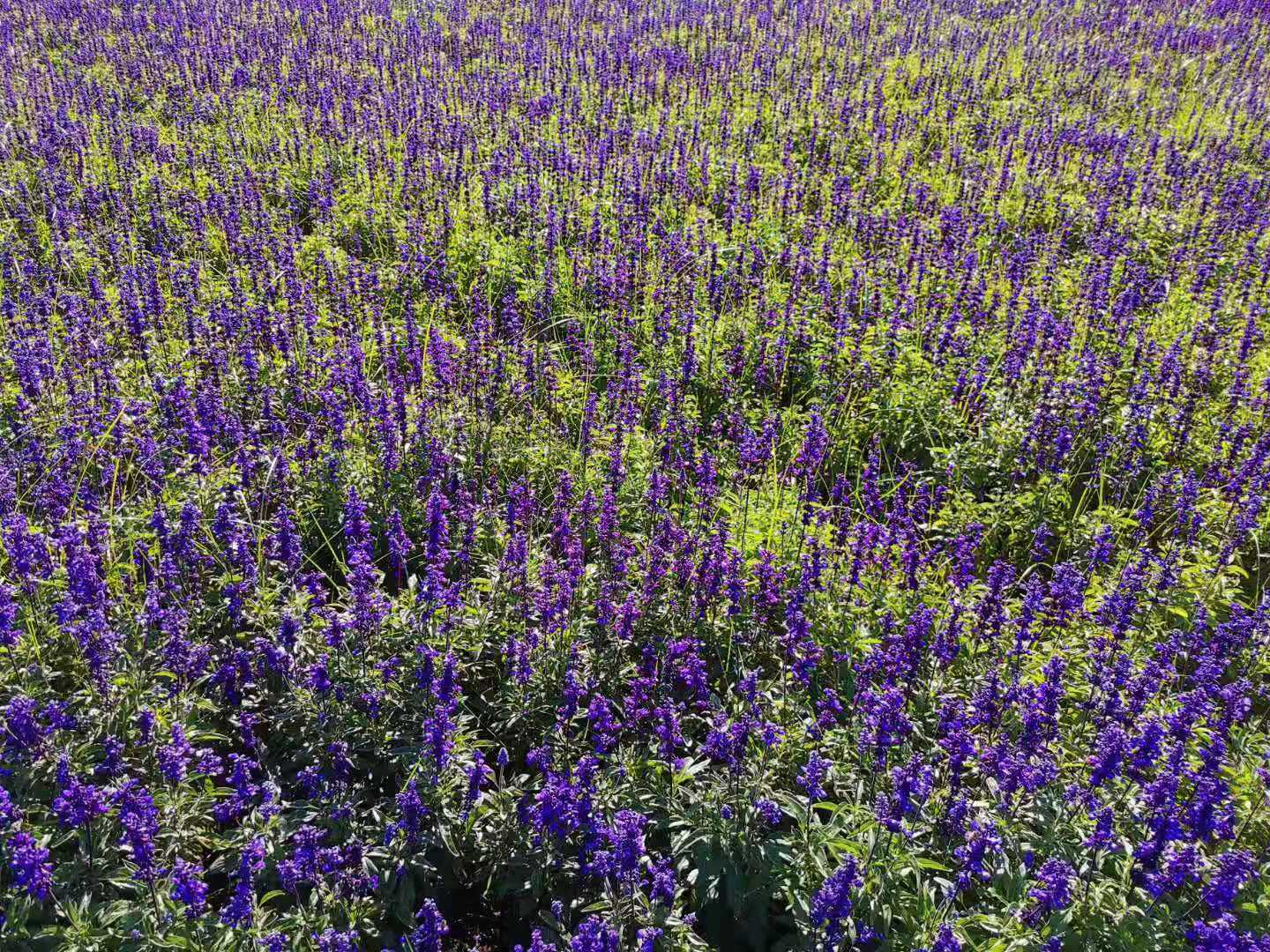
Exhibition of Flower Festival, Taichung, Taiwan.

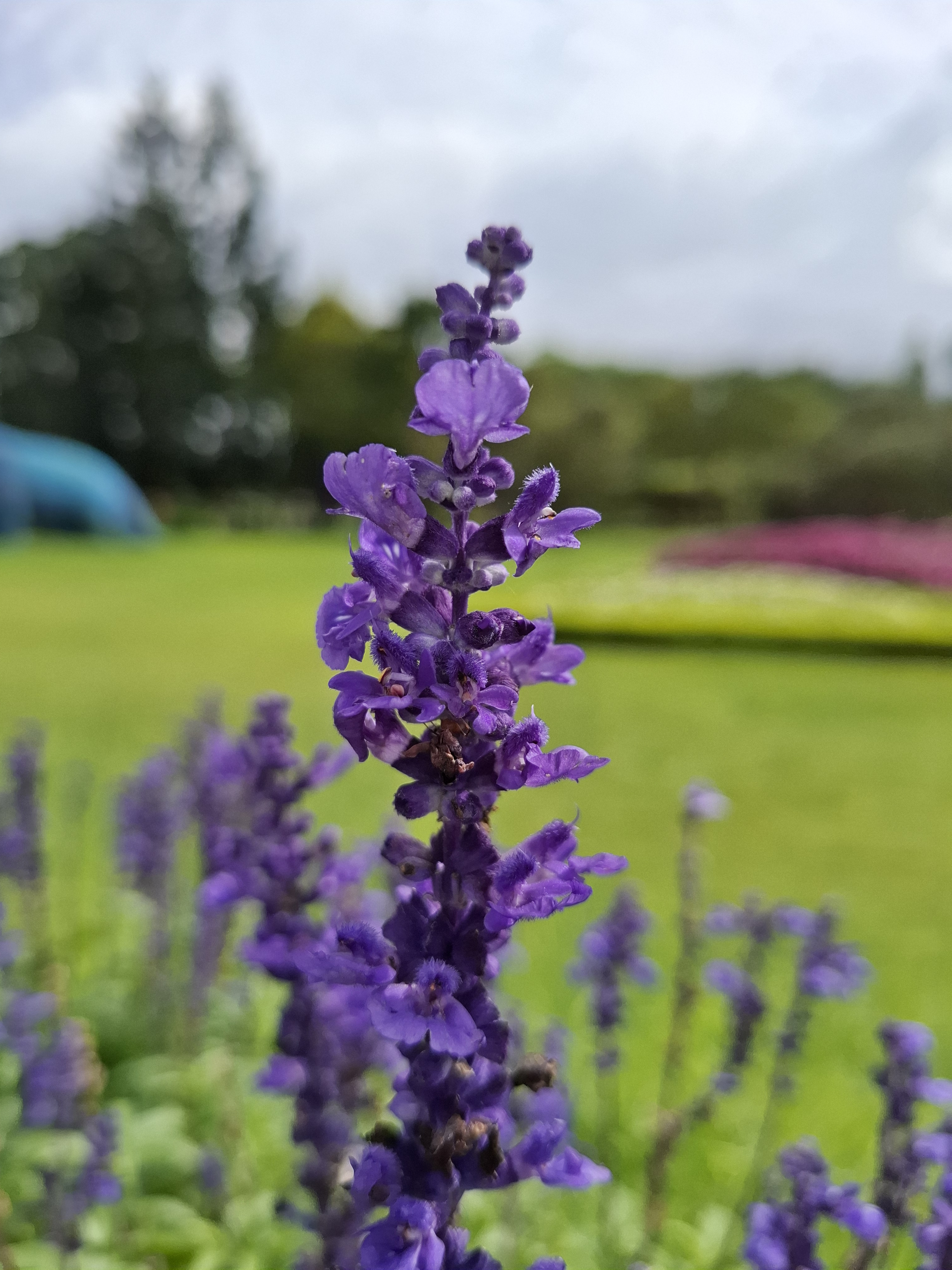
Flower in Indonesia

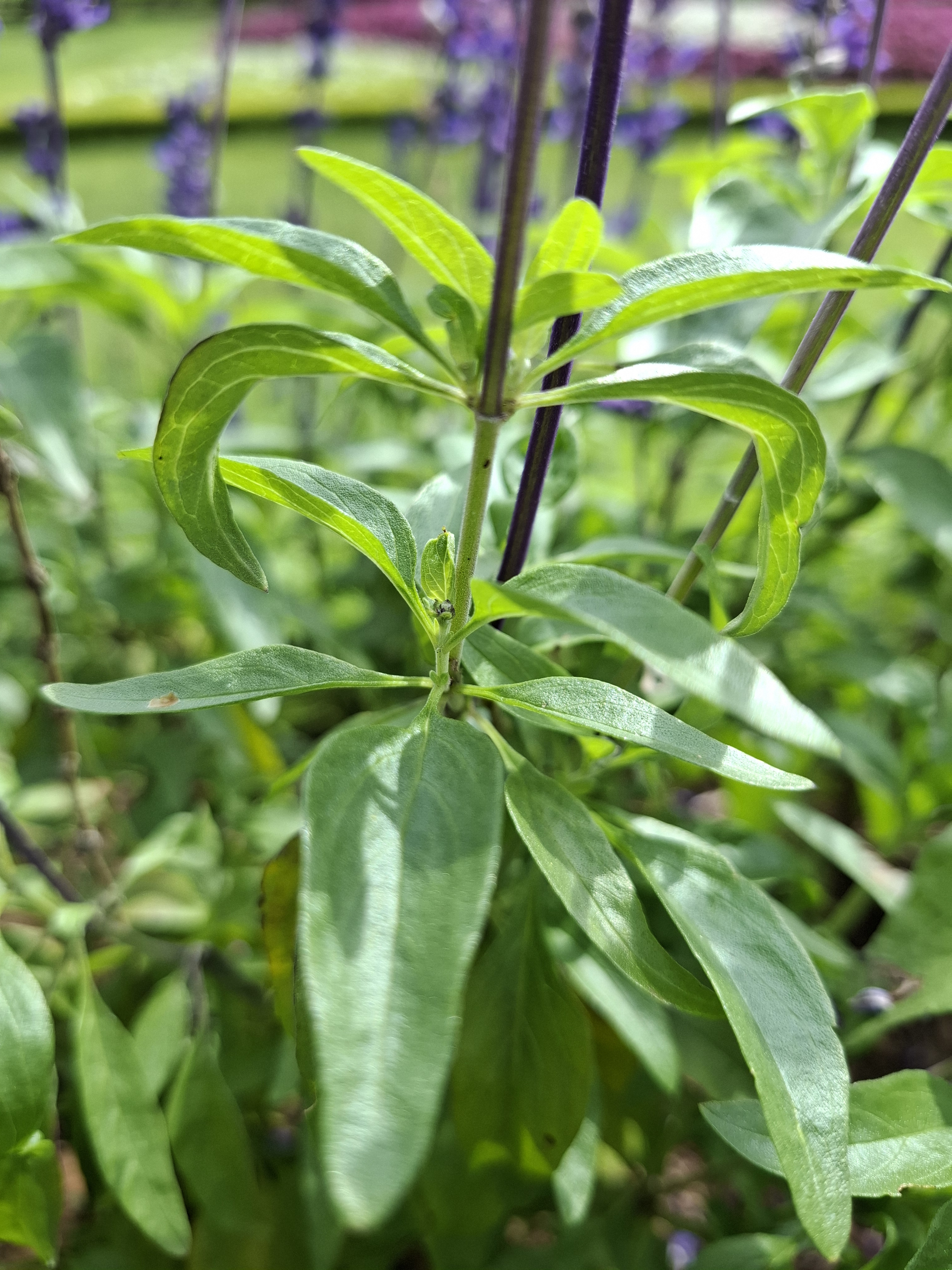
Leaves
