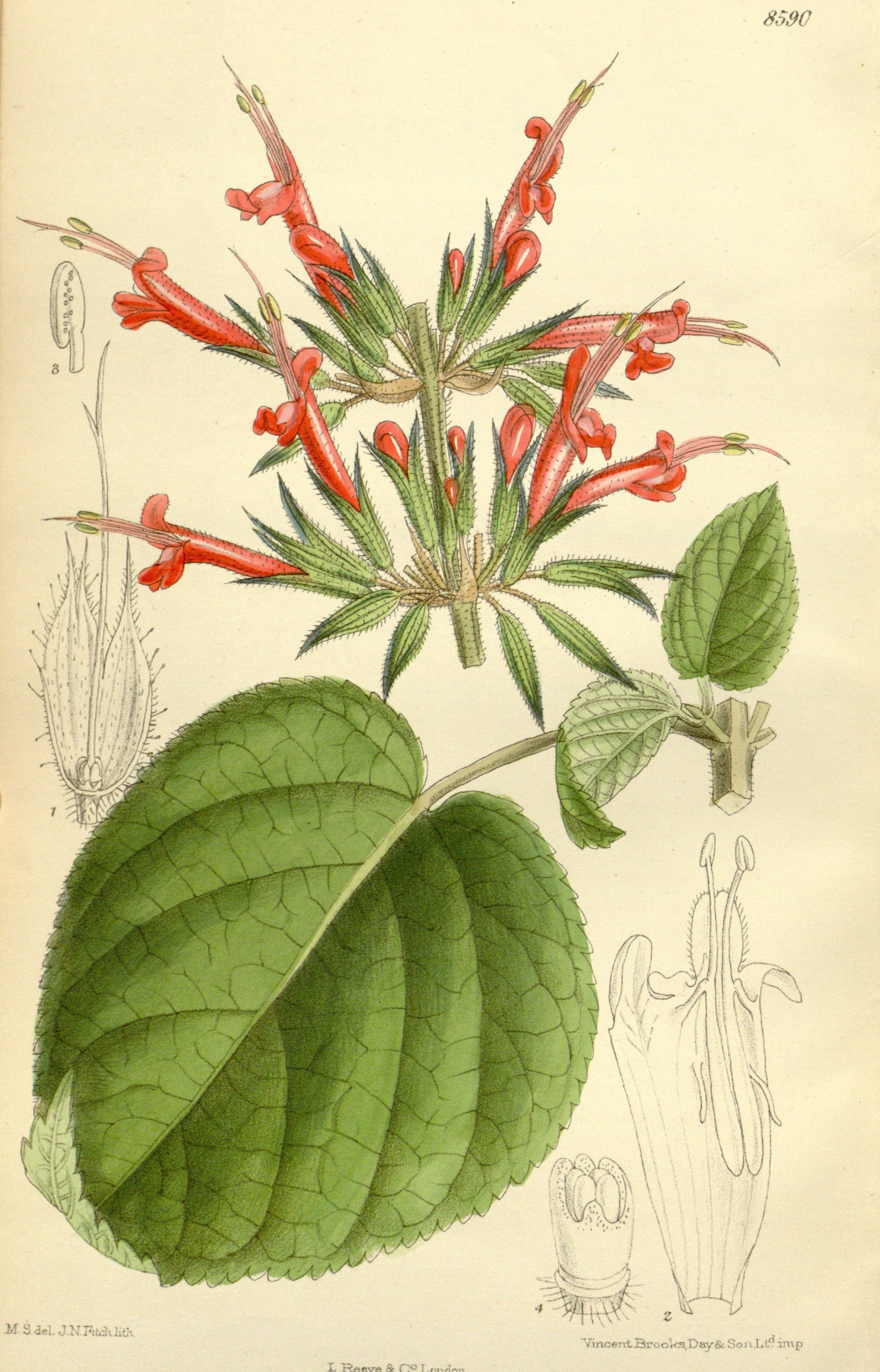

Scientific classification
- Kingdom: Plantae
- Clade: Tracheophytes
- Clade: Angiosperms
- Clade: Eudicots
- Clade: Asterids
- Order: Lamiales
- Family: Lamiaceae
- Genus: Salvia
- Species: S. longistyla

Binomial name
- Salvia longistyla Benth.

= Salvia longistyla =

Species of flowering plant

Salvia longistyla, Mexican sage, is a Mexican plant species which flowers in mid-autumn. It is not hardy, and is grows best in a container, propagated from cuttings. This salvia has handsome, green foliage, and the flowering stems have long, deep, wine-red flowers.
