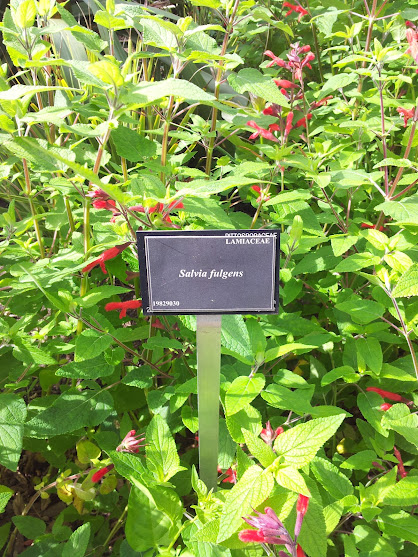

Scientific classification
- Kingdom: Plantae
- Clade: Tracheophytes
- Clade: Angiosperms
- Clade: Eudicots
- Clade: Asterids
- Order: Lamiales
- Family: Lamiaceae
- Genus: Salvia
- Species: S. fulgens

Binomial name
- Salvia fulgens Cav.

Synonyms
- Salvia cardinalis Kunth.

= Salvia fulgens =

Species of flowering plant

Salvia fulgens, the Cardinal sage or Mexican scarlet sage, is a species of flowering plant native to the Mexican mountains adjacent to the state of Puebla, growing at 8,700-11,000 ft elevation. It prefers the edge of oak and coniferous woodlands, especially in clearings of Abies religiosa. The mountains receive fog and rain nearly year-round.

== Description ==
Salvia fulgens is a small subshrub growing 50–100 cm (20–39 in) tall by 40–90 cm (16–35 in) wide. The 3 cm (1 in) long flowers grow in loose whorls, and are brilliant red, reflecting the common name and the synonym S. cardinalis. The upper lip has red hairs which glisten (fulgens) in the morning dew. A reddish-brown calyx remains long after the flowers drop. Inflorescences are usually about 4 in long, though occasionally a 12 in inflorescence appears. The heart-shaped leaves are pale yellow-green, about 1.5 in long by 1 in wide, and cover the plant quite profusely.

It was introduced into Western horticulture in the 19th century. It has been grown in Britain for many years. It has gained the Royal Horticultural Society's Award of Garden Merit.
