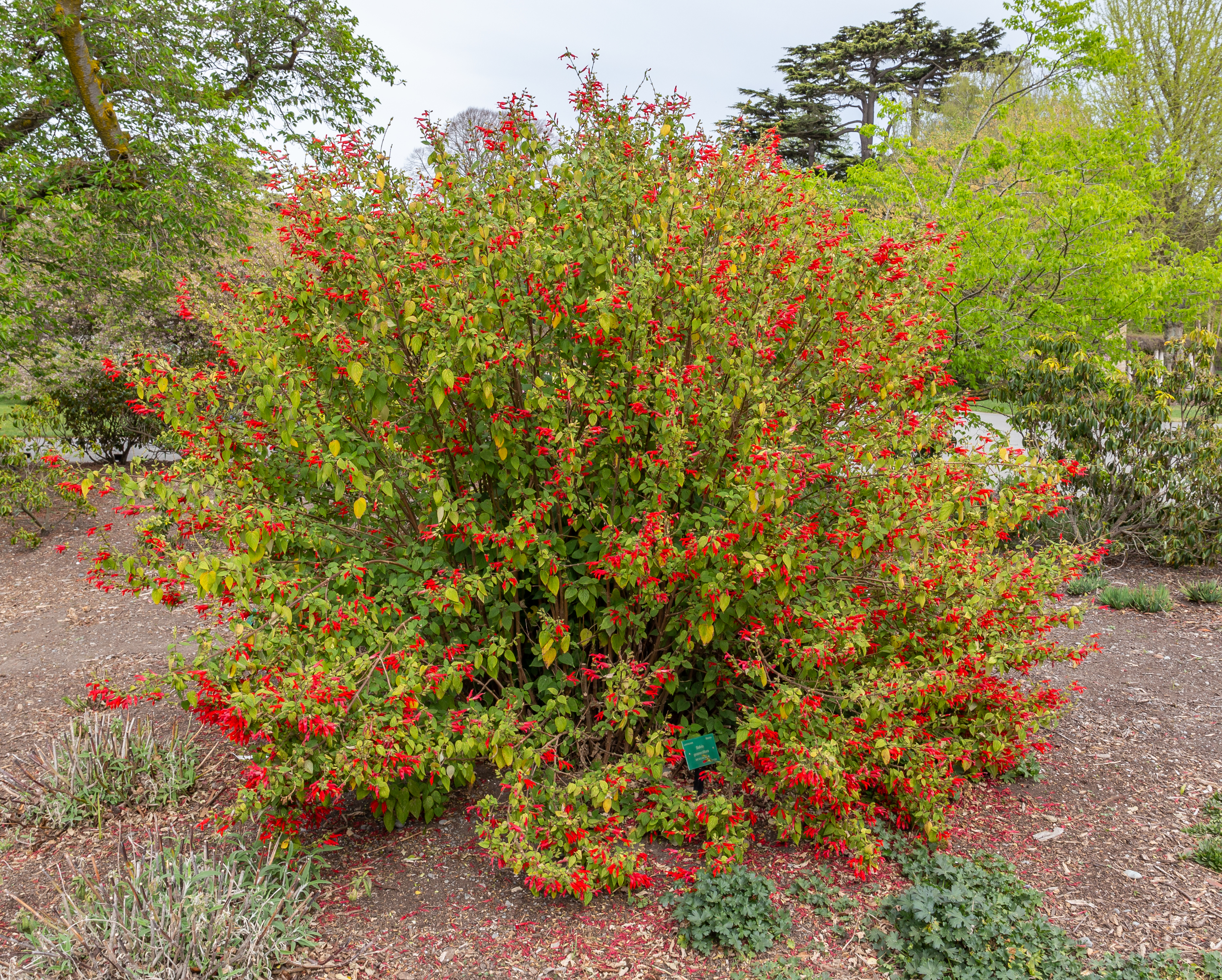

Scientific classification
- Kingdom: Plantae
- Clade: Tracheophytes
- Clade: Angiosperms
- Clade: Eudicots
- Clade: Asterids
- Order: Lamiales
- Family: Lamiaceae
- Genus: Salvia
- Species: S. gesneriflora

Binomial name
- Salvia gesneriflora Lindl. & Paxton

= Salvia gesneriflora =

Species of shrub

Salvia gesneriflora (sometimes spelled Salvia gesneriiflora) is a herbaceous perennial plant or subshrub native to mountainous provinces of the Sierra Madre Oriental in Mexico, growing at 7,500–10,000 ft (2,300–3,000 m) elevation. The long tubular flowers of this salvia resemble Gesneria flowers. It is a popular ornamental plant.

== Description ==
In its native habitat, Salvia gesneriflora is reported to grow up to 25 ft (7.6 m) high, though in cultivation it only reaches 5 ft (1.5 m) high and 3–4 ft (0.91–1.22 m) wide due to wind breakage or pruning. Hard annual pruning prevents the plant from breakage. The plant has many woody stems and very heavy with foliage that break easily in wind and rain. The heart-shaped leaves are mid-green, very aromatic, and graduated in size.

The large flowers grow up to 1.5 in (3.8 cm) long, and are a vivid orange-red, held in a 1.5 in (3.8 cm) yellow-green calyx tinged with purple glands. They grow abundantly in tightly spaced whorls on 8–12 in (20–30 cm) long inflorescences. It blooms in late winter and early spring, with hard annual pruning (down to leaf nodes near the ground) recommended after blooming. The plant will grow back to 6 ft (1.8 m) in one season.

== Varieties ==
In a 1970 collecting trip to Mexico by Huntington Botanical Gardens, two distinct varieties were collected — one with the more common green calyx, and one with a purple calyx and stem which was given the cultivar name 'Tequila'. A seedling selected from 'Tequila' around 1979 was named 'Mole Poblano', though there is some evidence that it is not distinct from 'Tequila'.
