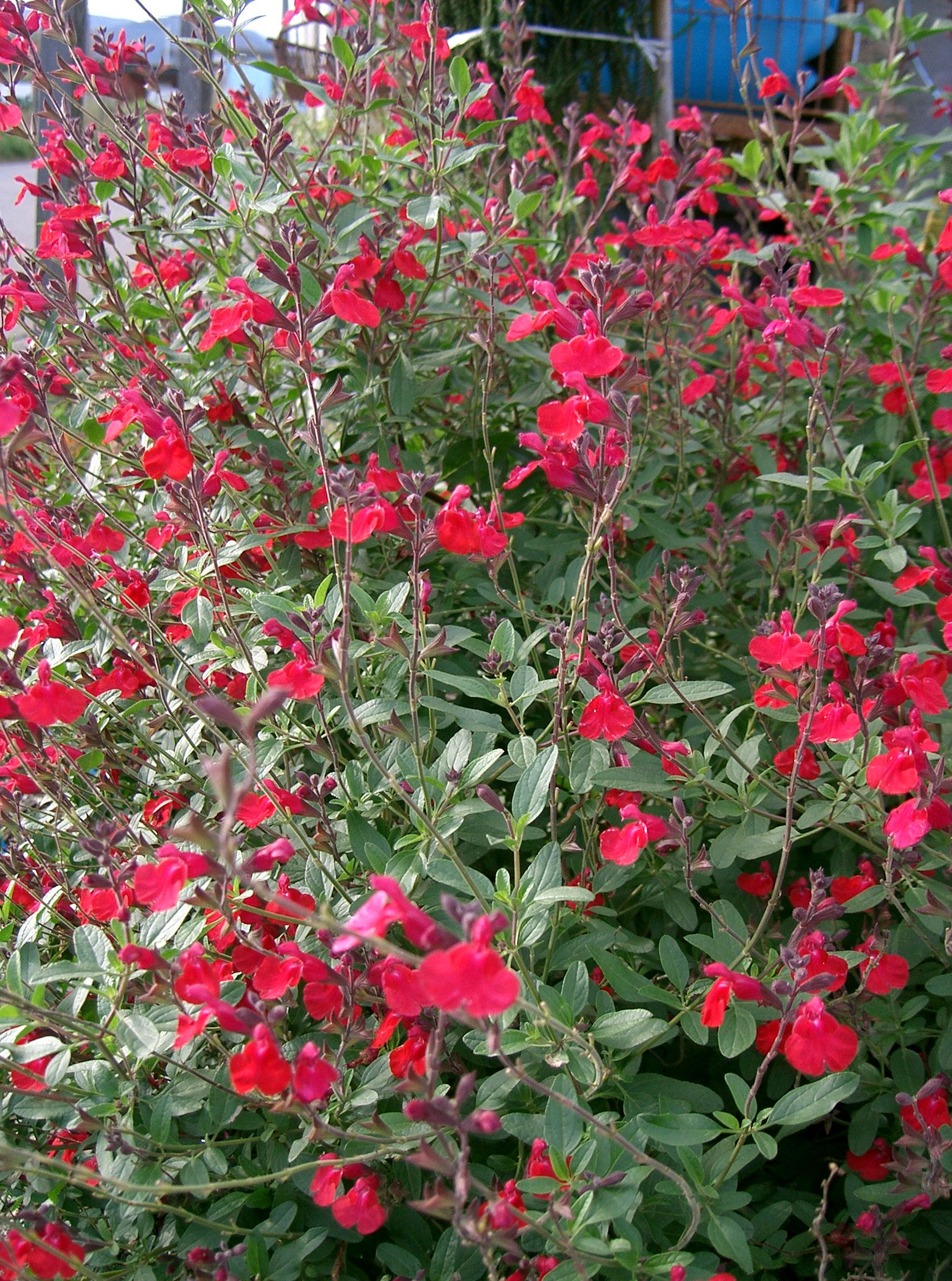
- Garden cultivar of Salvia microphylla

Scientific classification
- Kingdom: Plantae
- Clade: Embryophytes
- Clade: Tracheophytes
- Clade: Spermatophytes
- Clade: Angiosperms
- Clade: Eudicots
- Clade: Asterids
- Order: Lamiales
- Family: Lamiaceae
- Genus: Salvia
- Species: S. microphylla

Binomial name
- Salvia microphylla Kunth

Synonyms
- Lasemia coccinea Raf., nom. superfl.; Lesemia coccinea Raf., nom. superfl.; Salvia gasterantha Briq.; Salvia grahamii Benth.; Salvia lemmonii A.Gray; Salvia menthifolia Ten.; Salvia microphylla var. canescens A.Gray; Salvia microphylla var. neurepia (Fernald) Epling; Salvia microphylla var. wislizeni A.Gray; Salvia neurepia Fernald; Salvia obtusa M.Martens & Galeotti; Salvia odoratissima Sessé & Moc.

= Salvia microphylla =

Species of shrub

Salvia microphylla, synonyms including Salvia grahamii, Salvia lemmonii and Salvia neurepia; the baby sage, Graham's sage, or blackcurrant sage, is an evergreen shrub found in the wild in southeastern Arizona and the mountains of eastern, western, and southern Mexico. It is a very complex species which easily hybridizes, resulting in numerous hybrids and cultivars brought into horticulture since the 1990s. The specific epithet microphylla, from the Greek, means "small leaved". In Mexico it is called mirto de montes, or "myrtle of the mountains".

== Description ==
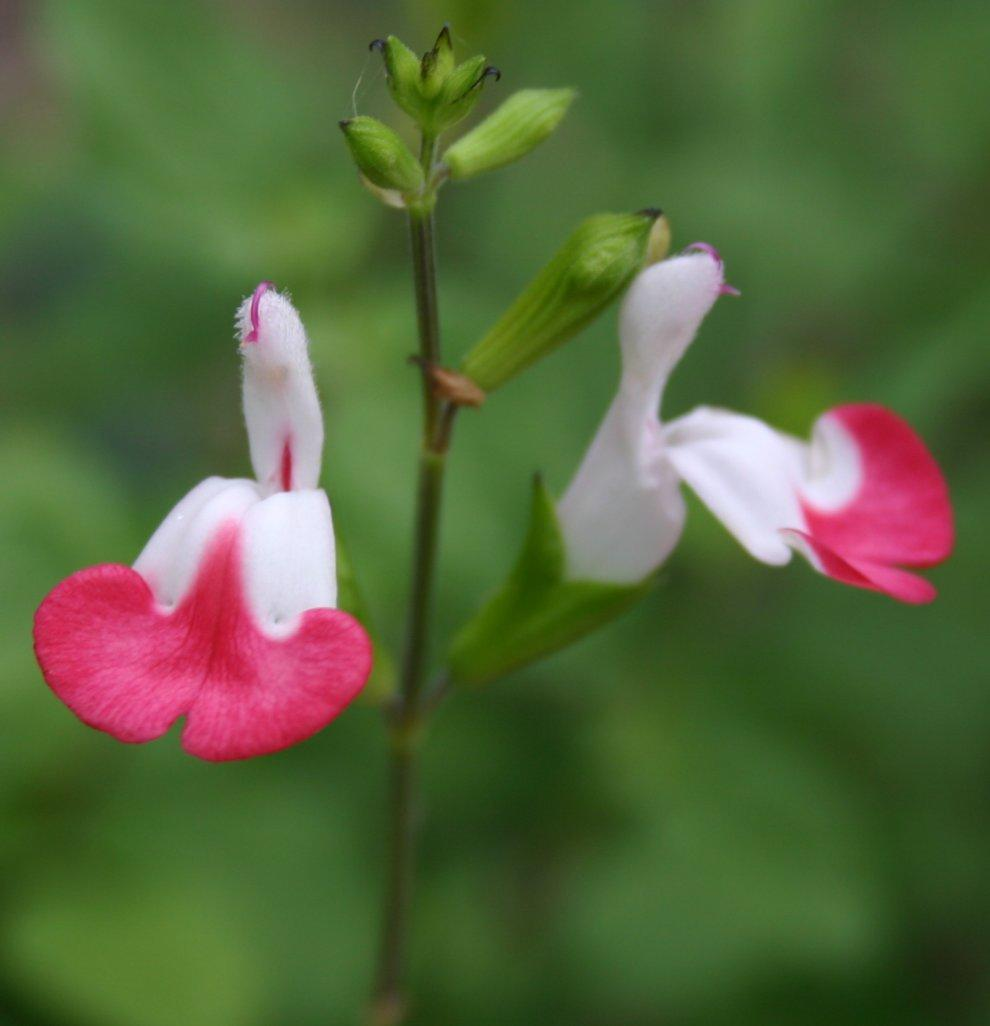
S. microphylla 'Hot Lips'

Salvia microphylla grows to 1 to 1.3 m (3.3 to 4.3 ft) tall and wide, blooming in its first year and growing to full size in its second year. The leaves are ovate shaped, of varying sizes, and smooth or lightly covered with hairs. When crushed, the leaves have a strong fragrance, which has been described as pleasant and mint-like, but also as similar to that of blackcurrants, leading to the use of "blackcurrant sage” as an English name for this species. It sometimes spreads underground, producing dense patches.

Along with its cultivars and hybrids, S. microphylla blooms heavily in late spring and again in autumn, with sporadic flowering year-round in mild conditions. The flowers are arranged in whorls, with a wide range of color: magenta, red, pink, and rose.

== Taxonomy ==
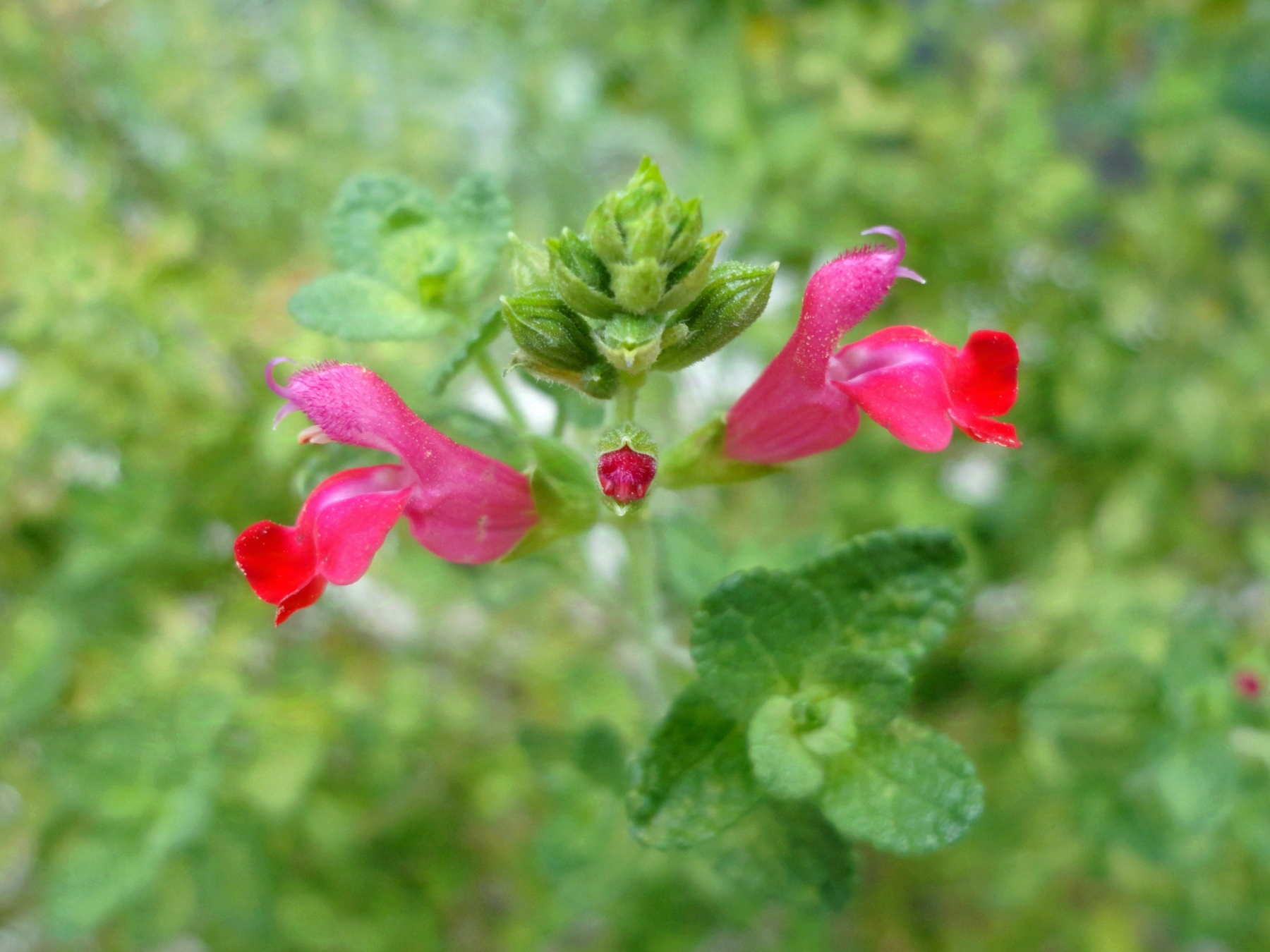
S. microphylla

Botanist Carl Epling considered Salvia microphylla to have three geographical races, though the wide variation still causes confusion today, and there are conceivably more than three races. Adding to the confusion, Salvia microphylla is often mistaken for Salvia greggii, with which it frequently hybridizes. Epling distinguishes between the two by the S. microphylla leaves, which have serrated edges, compared to the narrow, elliptic, and smooth-edged S. greggii leaves — and by a pair of papillae inside the S. microphylla corolla.

In the U.S. it is sometimes called "Graham's sage," as it was named Salvia grahamii by George Bentham. It was also named Salvia neurepia by Merritt Lyndon Fernald. As of April 2024, both these scientific names were considered to be synonyms of Salvia microphylla.

There has also been confusion between Salvia microphylla and Salvia lemmonii, which was named by Asa Gray. Later, Gray began calling it Salvia microphylla var. wislizeni, considering it to be a variety of S. microphylla. As of April 2024, Salvia lemmonii was considered to be a synonym of Salvia microphylla.

=== Proposed varieties ===
Varieties of Salvia microphylla that have been proposed include the following, although all were regarded as synonymous with the species by Plants of the World Online as of April 2024:

- S. microphylla var. canescens A.Gray
- S. microphylla var. neurepia (Fernald) Epling
- S. microphylla var. wislizeni A.Gray

== Cultivars and hybrids ==
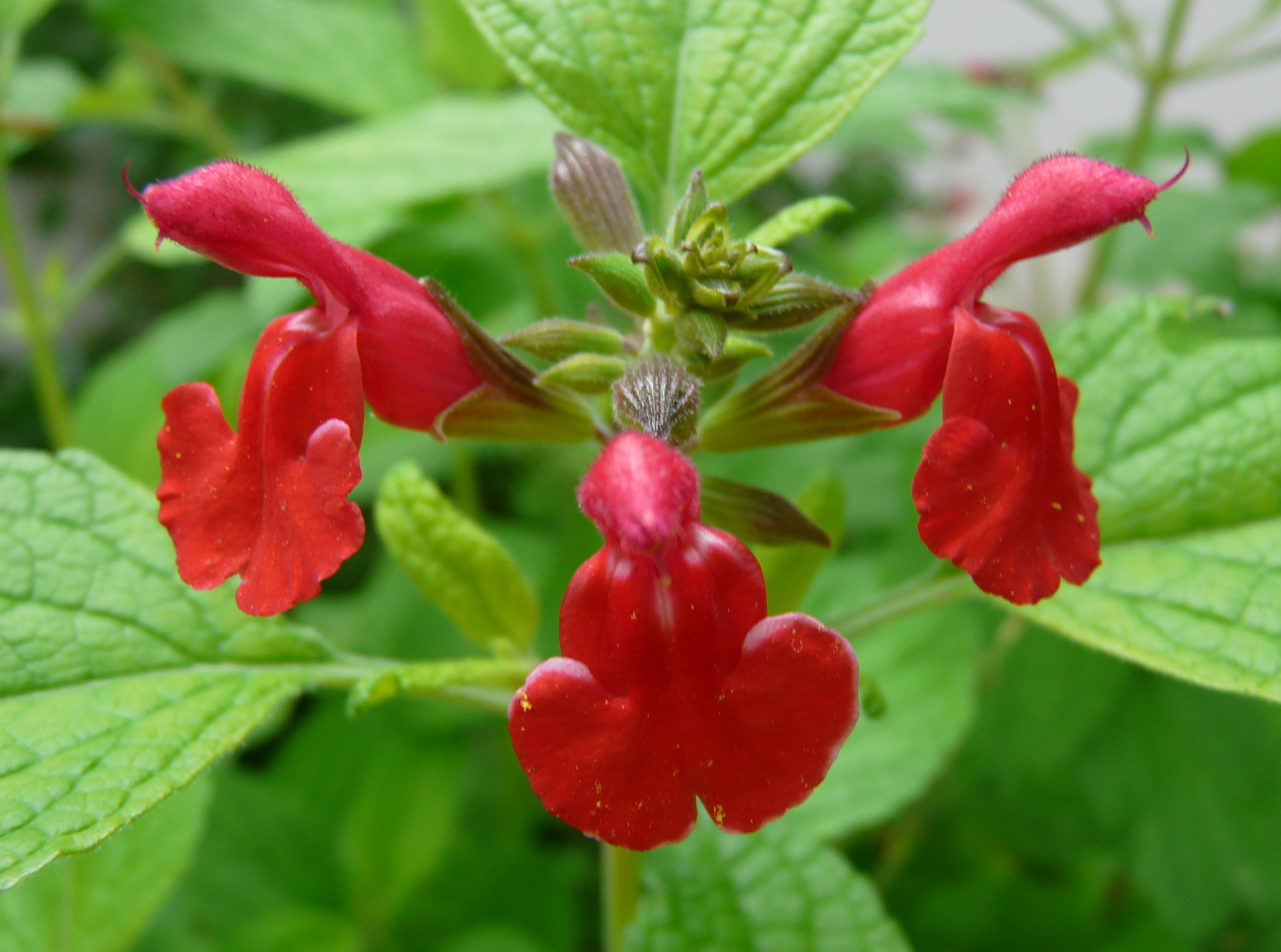
Salvia microphylla 'Forever Red'

Some cultivars are hybrids with Salvia greggii (known as Salvia × jamensis) and other Salvia species; collectively they may be called "Mexican salvias". Technically they are evergreen shrubs or sub-shrubs, though they are not reliably hardy and are also short-lived. However, they are easy to propagate from cuttings. Those marked AGM have gained the Royal Horticultural Society's Award of Garden Merit.

- 'Alba': White flowers
- 'Blush Pink': Rich pink flowers
- 'Cerro Potosi':AGM Large vibrant magenta flowers
- 'Desert Blaze': Bright red flowers, variegated yellow and green leaves
- 'Forever Red': Shrublike, long-blooming, scarlet flowers
- 'Graham's Sage': Many red flowers blooming simultaneously
- 'Hoja Grande': Magenta-red flowers and dark green leaves
- 'Hot Lips':AGM Flowers variable in colour with temperature and day length: in summer bicolored with a white base and bright red top or all red; in autumn sometimes completely white as the days shorten
- 'James Compton': Oval, serrated leaves; large, dark crimson flowers
- 'Kew Red': Vigorous grower with vivid red flowers
- 'La Foux': Deep crimson flowers with dark calyces
- 'La Trinidad Pink': Bright pink flowers
- var. neurepia (Fern.) Epling: Flowers cherry red in autumn
- 'Newby Hall': 6 feet (2m), bright scarlet flowers
- 'Oxford': Dark pink flowers
- 'Pat Vlasto' (S. × jamensis): Leaves unserrated; peach-orange blossoms
- 'Pink Blush': Free flowering, rose-magenta flowers
- 'Pleasant View': Pink flowers
- 'Red Velvet': Lustrous red flowers
- ‘Ribambelle’:AGM a profusion of salmon pink flowers
- 'Rosita': Repeat bloomer with bright candy-pink flowers
- 'Royal Bumble':agm large deep crimson flowers on a bushy evergreen plant
- 'Ruth Stungo': Leaves variegated green and white
- 'San Carlos Festival: magenta-scarlet flowers, gray-green leaves
- 'Trebah': Upright, lilac white flowers
- 'Trelawney': Upright, rose-pink flowers
- 'Trelissick': Upright, creamy yellow flowers
- 'Trenance': Upright, lilac-pink flowers
- 'Trewithin': Upright, cerise flowers
- 'Wild Watermelon': large pink flowers with dark calyces

== Uses ==
Salvia microphylla is grown in central Mexico as a medicinal plant, and used for making tea.
