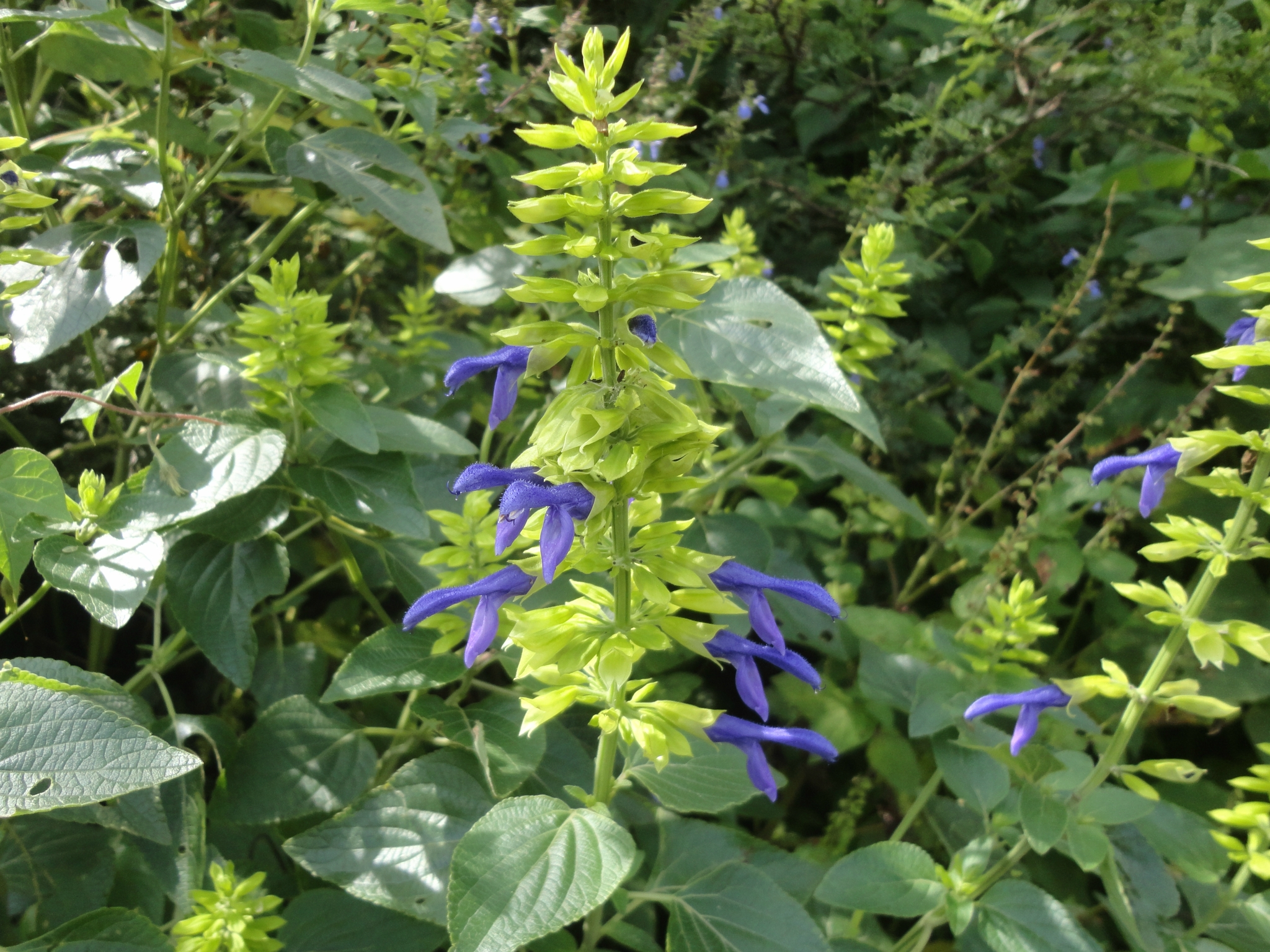

Scientific classification
- Kingdom: Plantae
- Clade: Tracheophytes
- Clade: Angiosperms
- Clade: Eudicots
- Clade: Asterids
- Order: Lamiales
- Family: Lamiaceae
- Genus: Salvia
- Species: S. mexicana

Binomial name
- Salvia mexicana L.

= Salvia mexicana =

Species of shrub

Salvia mexicana (Mexican sage) is a herbaceous shrubby perennial native to a wide area of central Mexico, growing at elevations from 2,600 to 8,500 feet (800 to 2,600 metres). It grows in tropical areas in the south and arid subtropical habitats in the north, often at the edges of forests.

Salvia mexicana grows 3 to 9 feet (0.9 to 2.7 metres) tall and 3 to 4 feet (0.9 to 1.2 metres) wide in cultivation, with leaves ranging from mid-green and glabrous, to gray green with short hairs. The inflorescences also vary, in length and in size of flower. The color of flowers and calyces range from midnight-purple to purple-blue. The flowers bloom in late summer, in whorls that are produced abundantly for several months.

The earliest records of Salvia mexicana in horticulture are beginning in the 1970s at several botanical gardens. One popular cultivar is 'Limelight' (pictured at right), collected in the state of Querétaro, which has violet-blue flowers with large chartreuse-green calyces. 'Lollie Jackson' is a compact cultivar; 'Ocampo' is an upright cultivar growing to 7 feet (2 metres) — both are commonly sold in nurseries.
