= Salvia =

- Common sage (Salvia officinalis)

Scientific classification
- Kingdom: Plantae
- Clade: Tracheophytes
- Clade: Angiosperms
- Clade: Eudicots
- Clade: Asterids
- Order: Lamiales
- Family: Lamiaceae
- Subfamily: Nepetoideae
- Tribe: Mentheae
- Genus: Salvia; L.

Type species
- Salvia officinalis L.

Species
- see List of Salvia species

Synonyms
- List: Aethiopis (Benth.) Opiz; Aethyopys (Benth.) Opiz; Aitopsis Raf.; Arischrada Pobed.; Audibertia Benth., nom. illeg.; Audibertiella Briq.; Belospis Raf.; Calosphace Raf.; Codanthera Raf.; Covola Medik.; Crolocos Raf.; Dorystaechas Boiss. & Heldr. ex Benth.; Drymosphace Opiz; Elelis Raf.; Enipea Raf.; Epiadena Raf.; Euriples Raf.; Fenixanthes Raf.; Flipanta Raf.; Gallitrichum Fourr.; Glutinaria Raf.; Hematodes Raf.; Hemisphace Opiz; Hemistegia Raf.; Horminum Mill., nom. illeg.; Jungia Heist. ex Fabr., nom. rej.; Kiosmina Raf.; Larnastyra Raf.; Lasemia Raf.; Leonia Cerv.; Leonura Usteri ex Steud.; Lesemia Raf.; Megyathus Raf.; Melinum Medik.; Melligo Raf.; Meriandra Benth.; Oboskon Raf.; Ormiastis Raf.; Ormilis Raf.; Perovskia Kar.; Piaradena Raf.; Plethiosphace Opiz; Pleudia Raf.; Polakia Stapf; Pycnosphace Rydb.; Ramona Greene; Rhodochlamys S.Schauer; Rhodormis Raf.; Rosmarinus L.; Salviastrum Scheele; Schraderia Medik.; Sclarea Mill.; Sobiso Raf.; Sphacopsis Briq.; Stenarrhena D.Don; Stiefia Medik.; Terepis Raf.; Zhumeria Rech.f. & Wendelbo

Largest genus of plants in the mint family

Salvia (/ˈsælviə/) is the largest genus of plants in the sage family Lamiaceae, with just under 1,000 species of shrubs, herbaceous perennials, and annuals. Within the Lamiaceae, Salvia is part of the tribe Mentheae within the subfamily Nepetoideae. One of several genera commonly referred to as sage, it includes two widely used herbs, Salvia officinalis (common sage, or just "sage") and Salvia rosmarinus (rosemary, formerly Rosmarinus officinalis).

The genus is distributed throughout the Old World and the Americas (over 900 total species), with three distinct regions of diversity: Central America and South America (approximately 600 species); Central Asia and the Mediterranean (250 species); Eastern Asia (90 species).

== Etymology ==
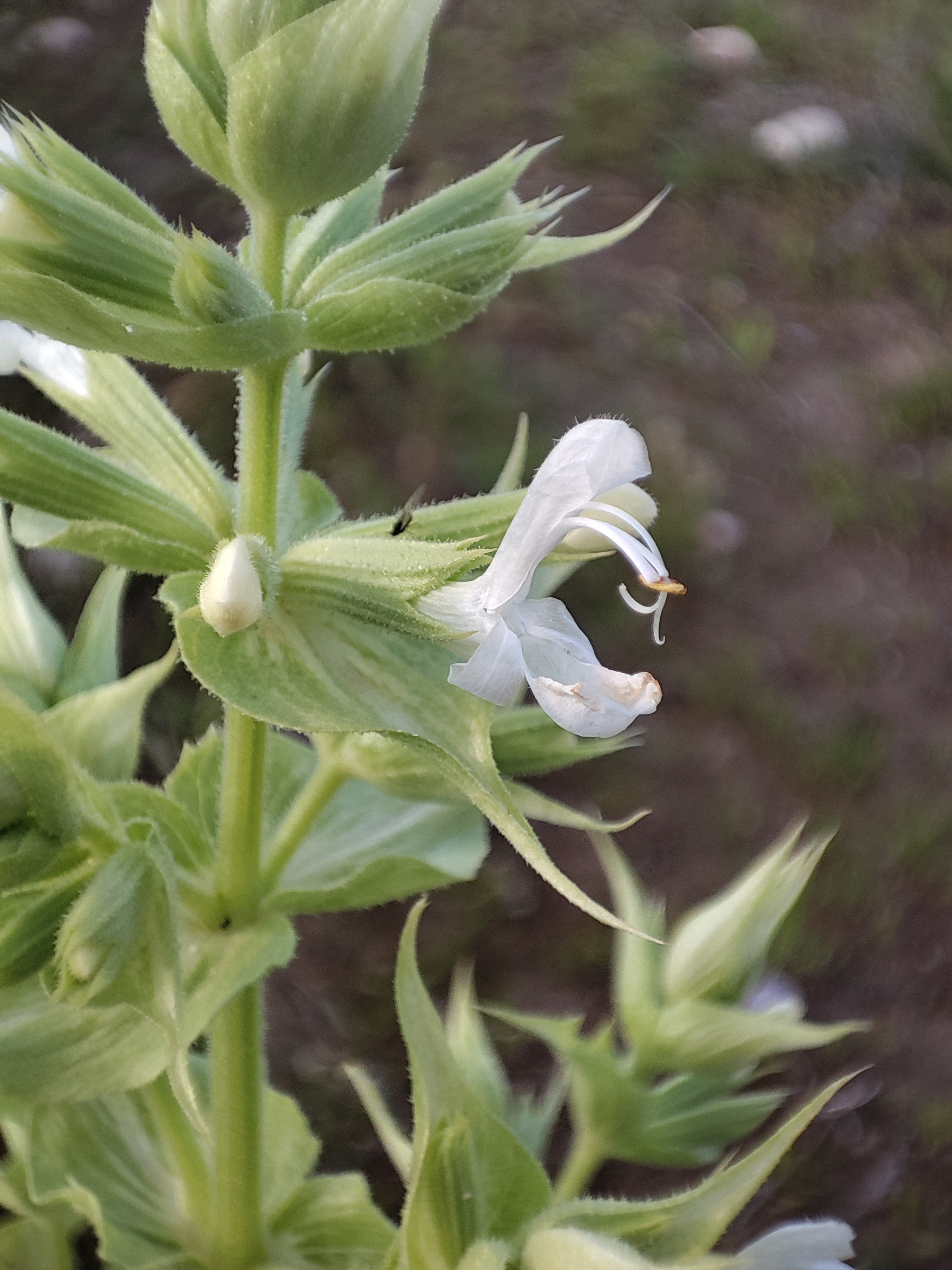
Salvia tingitana flower in Behbahan

The name Salvia derives from Latin salvia (sage), from salvus (safe, secure, healthy), an adjective related to salūs (health, well-being, prosperity or salvation), and salvēre (to feel healthy, to heal). Pliny the Elder was the first author known to describe a plant called "Salvia" by the Romans, likely describing the type species for the genus Salvia, Salvia officinalis.

The common modern English name sage derives from Middle English sawge, which was borrowed from Old French sauge, from Latin salvia (the source of the botanical name). When used without modifiers, the name "sage" generally refers to Salvia officinalis ("common sage" or "culinary sage"), although it is used with modifiers to refer to any member of the genus. The ornamental species are commonly referred to by their genus name Salvia.

== Description ==
Salvia species include annual, biennial, or perennial herbaceous plants, along with woody subshrubs. The stems are typically angled like other members in Lamiaceae. The leaves are typically entire, but sometimes toothed or pinnately divided. The flowering stems bear small bracts, dissimilar to the basal leaves—in some species the bracts are ornamental and showy.

The flowers are produced in racemes or panicles, and generally produce a showy display with flower colors ranging from blue to red, with white and yellow less common. The calyx is normally tubular or bell shaped, without bearded throats, and divided into two parts or lips, the upper lip entire or three-toothed, the lower two-cleft. The corollas are often claw shaped and are two-lipped. The upper lip is usually entire or three-toothed. The lower lip typically has two lobes. The stamens are reduced to two short structures with anthers two-celled, the upper cell fertile, and the lower imperfect. The flower styles are two-cleft. The fruits are smooth ovoid or oblong nutlets and in many species they have a mucilaginous coating.

Many members of Salvia have trichomes (hairs) growing on the leaves, stems and flowers, which help to reduce water loss in some species. Sometimes the hairs are glandular and secrete volatile oils that typically give a distinct aroma to the plant. When the hairs are rubbed or brushed, some of the oil-bearing cells are ruptured, releasing the oil. This often results in the plant being unattractive to grazing animals and some insects.

=== Staminal lever mechanism ===
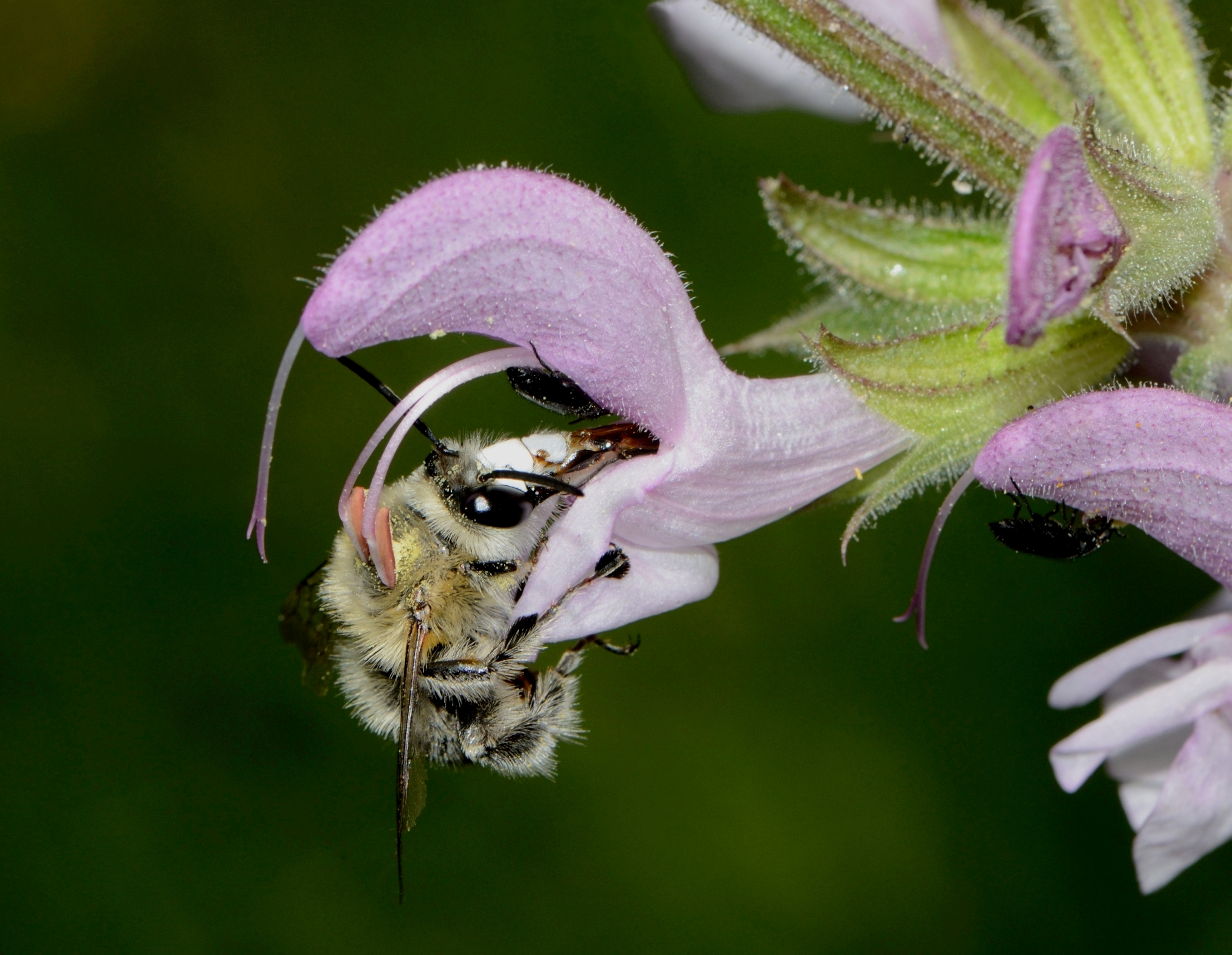
Male digger bee probing a male-stage flower of Salvia hierosolymitana. The stamens deposit pollen on the bee's back.

A female mountain carpenter bee robbing nectar from pineapple sage salvia without providing pollination services. The last scene played at one-fourth speed.

The defining characteristic of the genus Salvia is the unusual pollination mechanism. It is central to any investigation into the systematics, species distribution, or pollination biology of Salvia. It consists of two stamens (instead of the typical four found in other members of the tribe Mentheae) and the two thecae on each stamen are separated by an elongate connective which enables the formation of the lever mechanism. Sprengel (1732) was the first to illustrate and describe the nototribic (dorsal) pollination mechanism in Salvia. When a pollinator probes a male stage flower for nectar, (pushing the posterior anther theca) the lever causes the stamens to move and the pollen to be deposited on the pollinator. When the pollinator withdraws from the flower, the lever returns the stamens to their original position. In older, female stage flowers, the stigma is bent down in a general location that corresponds to where the pollen was deposited on the pollinator's body. The lever of most Salvia species is not specialized for a single pollinator, but is generic and selected to be easily released by many bird and bee pollinators of varying shapes and sizes. The lever arm can be specialized to be different lengths so that the pollen is deposited on different parts of the pollinator's body. For example, if a bee went to one flower and pollen was deposited on the far back of her body, but then it flew to another flower where the stigma was more forward (anterior), pollination could not take place. This can result in reproductive isolation from the parental population and new speciation can occur. It is believed that the lever mechanism is a key factor in the speciation, adaptive radiation, and diversity of this large genus.

== Taxonomy ==
=== History ===
George Bentham was first to give a full monographic account of the genus in 1832–1836, and based his classifications on staminal morphology. Bentham's work on classifying the family Labiatae (Labiatarum Genera et Species (1836)) is still the only comprehensive and global organization of the family. While he was clear about the integrity of the overall family, he was less confident about his organization of Salvia, the largest genus in Labiatae (also called Lamiaceae). Based on his own philosophy of classification, he wrote that he "ought to have formed five or six genera" out of Salvia. In the end, he felt that the advantage in placing a relatively uniform grouping in one genus was "more than counterbalanced by the necessity of changing more than two hundred names." At that time there were only 291 known Salvia species.

=== Subdivision ===
Salvia splendens

Bentham eventually organized Salvia into twelve sections (originally fourteen), based on differences in corolla, calyx, and stamens. These were placed into four subgenera that were generally divided into Old World and New World species:

- Subgenus Salvia: Old World (sections: Hymenosphace, Eusphace, Drymosphace)
- Subgenus Sclarea: Old World (sections: Horminum, Aethiposis, Plethiosphace)
- Subgenus Calosphace: New World (section: Calosphace)
- Subgenus Leonia: Old and New World (sections: Echinosphace, Pycnosphace, Heterosphace, Notiosphace, Hemisphace)

His system is still the most widely studied classification of Salvia, even though more than 500 new species have been discovered since his work. Other botanists have since offered modified versions of Bentham's classification system, while botanists in the last hundred years generally do not endorse Bentham's system.

It was long assumed that Salvia's unusual pollination and stamen structure had evolved only once, and that therefore Salvia was monophyletic, meaning that all members of the genus evolved from one ancestor. However, the immense diversity in staminal structure, vegetative habit, and floral morphology of the species within Salvia has opened the debate about its infrageneric classifications.

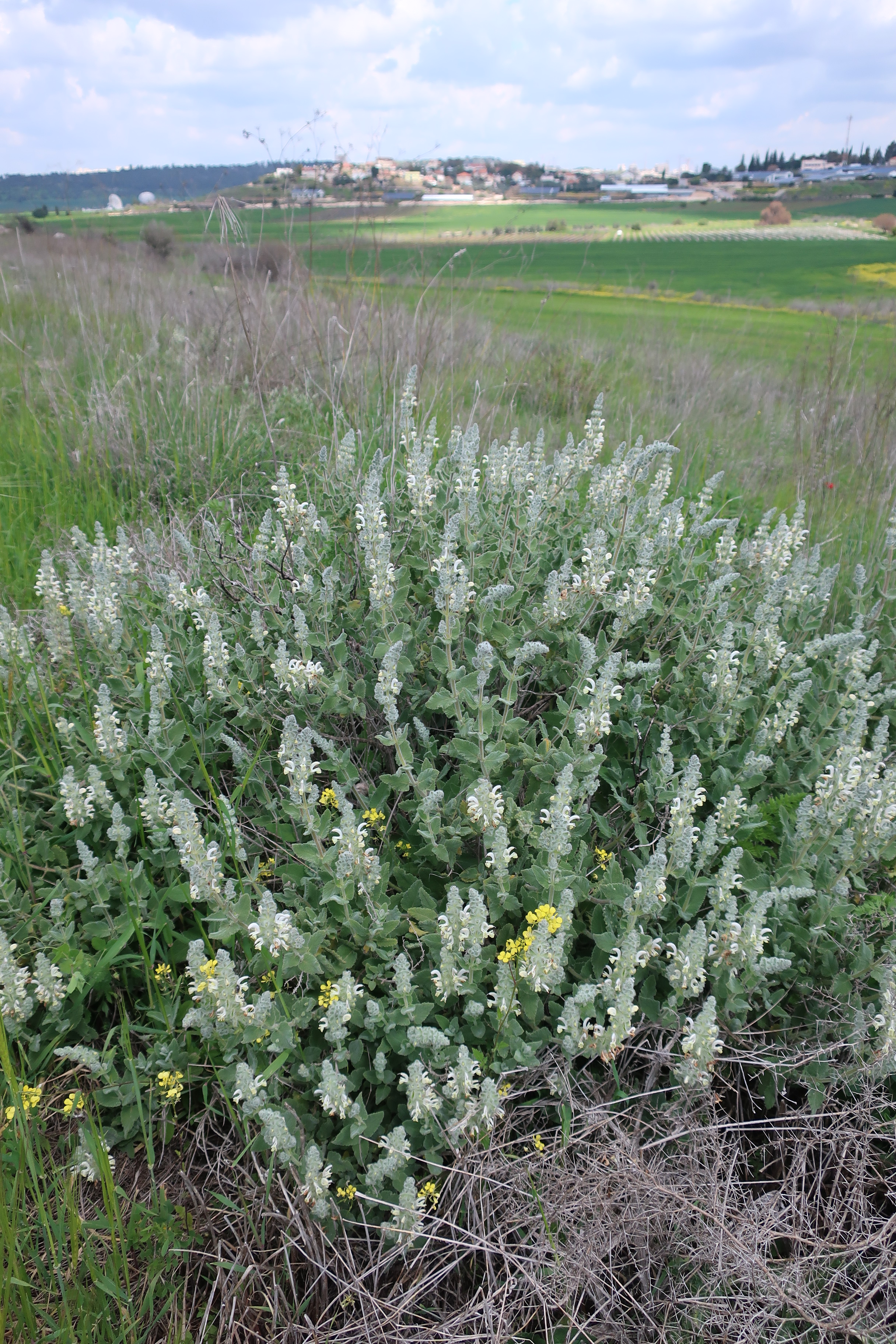
Patch of Dominican sage (Salvia dominica) growing in Israel

=== Phylogenetic analyses ===
Through DNA sequencing, Salvia was shown to not be monophyletic but to consist of three separate clades (Salvia clades I–III) each with different sister groups. They also found that the staminal lever mechanism evolved at least two separate times, through convergent evolution. Walker and Sytsma (2007) clarified this parallel evolution in a later paper combining molecular and morphological data to prove three independent lineages of the Salvia lever mechanism, each corresponding to a clade within the genus. It is surprising to see how similar the staminal lever mechanism structures are between the three lineages, so Salvia proves to be an interesting but excellent example of convergent evolution.

Walker and Sytsma (2007) also addressed the question of whether Salvia is truly polyphyletic or just paraphyletic within the tribe Mentheae. To make Salvia monophyletic would require the inclusion of 15 species from Rosmarinus, Perovskia, Dorystaechas, Meriandra, and Zhumeria genera. The information attained by Walker and Sytsma (2007) supporting the three independent origins of the staminal lever indicate that Salvia is not the case where 15 species (currently not members of the genus) are actually members of Salvia but underwent character reversals—in other words, Salvia is paraphyletic as previously circumscribed. In 2017 Drew et al. recircumscribed Salvia, proposing that the five small embedded genera (Dorystaechas, Meriandra, Perovskia, Rosmarinus, and Zhumeria) be subsumed into a broadly defined Salvia. This approach would require only 15 name changes whereas maintaining the five small genera and renaming various Salvia taxa would require over 700 name changes.

The circumscription of individual species within Salvia has undergone constant revision. Many species are similar to each other, and many species have varieties that have been given different specific names. There have been as many as 2,000 named species and subspecies. Over time, the number has been reduced to less than a thousand. A modern and comprehensive study of Salvia species was done by Gabriel Alziar, in his Catalogue Synonymique des Salvia du Monde (1989) (World Catalog of Salvia Synonyms). He found that the number of distinct species and subspecies could be reduced to less than 700.

== Selected species and their uses ==
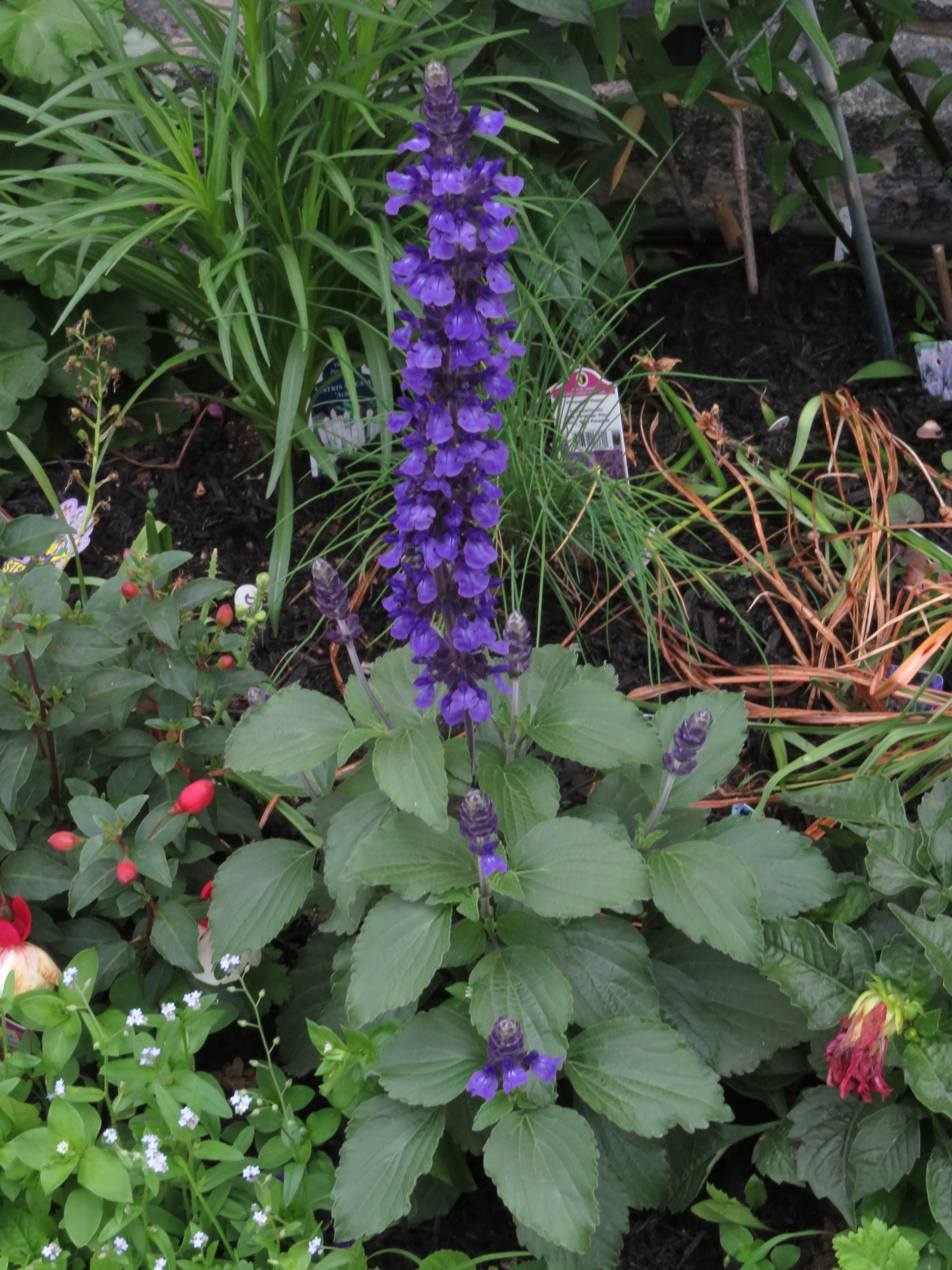
Salvia farinacea × Salvia longispicata Mystic Spires Blue 'Balsalmisp'

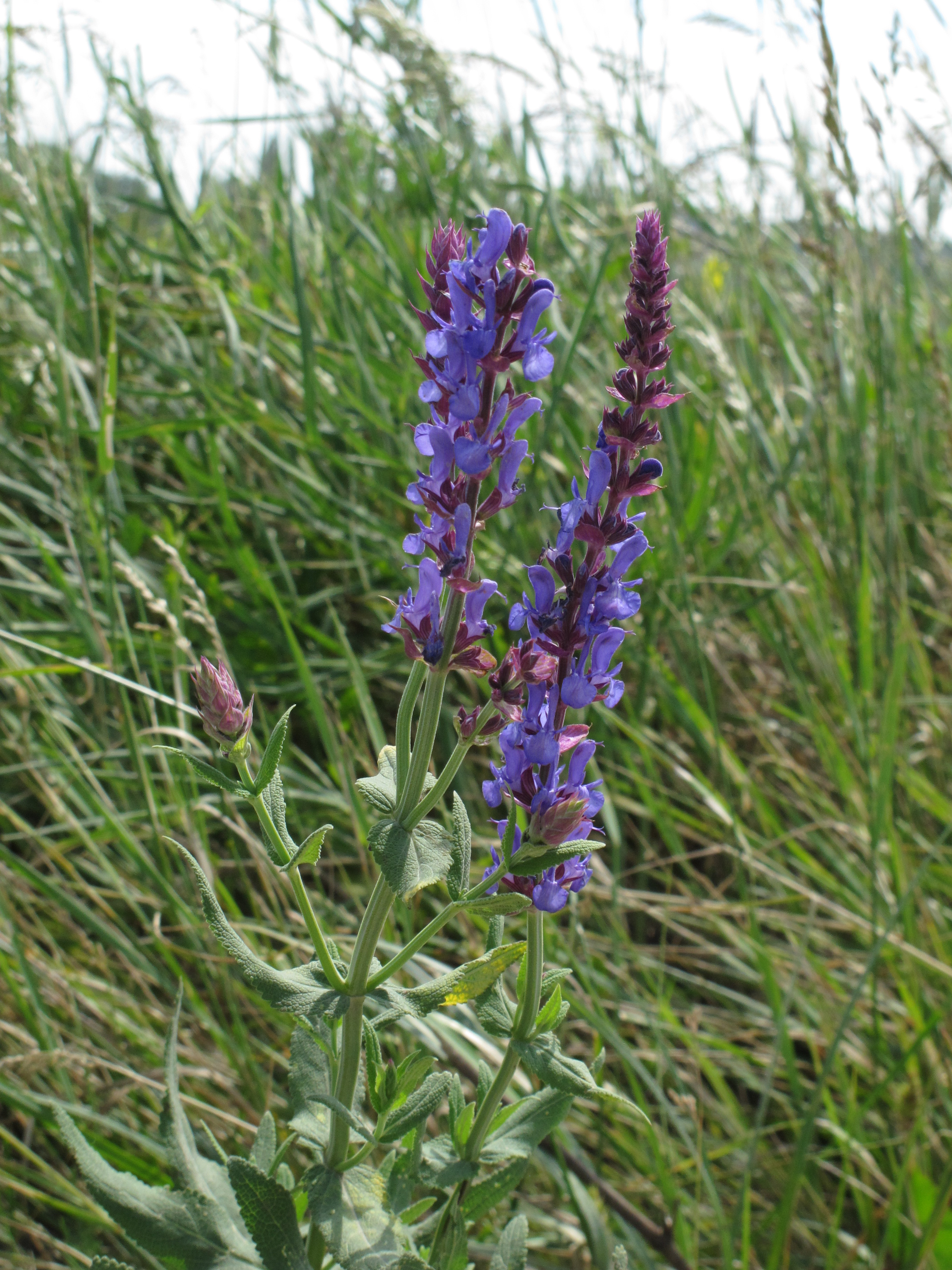
Woodland sage (Salvia nemorosa) in Austria

Many species are used as herbs, as ornamental plants (usually for flower interest), and sometimes for their ornamental and aromatic foliage. Some species, such as Salvia columbariae and Salvia hispanica, are also grown for their seeds. The Plant List has 986 accepted species names. A selection of some well-known species is below.

- Salvia apiana: white sage; sacred to a number of Native American peoples, and used by some tribes in their ceremonies
- Salvia azurea: blue sage
- Salvia buchananii: Buchanan sage; woody-based stoloniferous perennial, deep pink flowers
- Salvia cacaliifolia: blue vine sage or Guatemalan sage; pure gentian-blue flowers
- Salvia candelabrum: candelabrum sage; woody-based perennial, violet flowers
- Salvia columbariae: wild chia; annual plant with seeds that are sometimes used like those of Salvia hispanica
- Salvia dianthera Roth: Bengal sage
- Salvia divinorum: diviner's sage; sometimes cultivated for hallucinogenic effects; the legality of its use is under review in some US states
- Salvia elegans: pineapple sage; widely grown as an ornamental shrub or sub-shrub, with pineapple scented leaves
- Salvia fairuziana: Fairuz's sage; named after Lebanese singer Fairuz, endemic to Lebanon
- Salvia farinacea: Mealycup sage, mealy sage; perennial with flowers ranging from purple to blue, Used as an ornamental plant
- Salvia fruticosa: Greek sage; commonly grown and harvested as an alternative to common sage
- Salvia fulgens: Cardinal sage, Mexican scarlet sage; small evergreen sub-shrub, red flowers
- Salvia guaranitica: hummingbird sage, anise-scented sage; tall perennial, deep blue flowers
- Salvia hispanica: chia; produces edible seeds high in protein and in the omega-3 fatty acid, α-linolenic acid (ALA)
- Salvia involucrata: roseleaf sage; woody-based perennial
- Salvia jurisicii: Ovche Pole sage; a rare, compact "feathery" perennial endemic to North Macedonia, violet flowers
- Salvia leucantha: Mexican bush sage, woolly sage; ornamental evergreen subshrub, white/pink flowers
- Salvia microphylla: baby sage: small ornamental shrub from Mexico, widely cultivated with many cultivars
- Salvia miltiorrhiza: red sage, Danshen; Chinese medicinal herb
- Salvia nemorosa: woodland sage, Balkan clary; perennial with many ornamental varieties and cultivars
- Salvia officinalis: sage, common sage; used widely in cooking, as an ornamental, and in herbal medicine
- Salvia patens: gentian sage; herbaceous perennial, blue flowers
- Salvia pratensis: clary: herbaceous perennial, violet flowers
- Salvia rosmarinus: rosemary; woody shrub, blue flowers
- Salvia sclarea: clary; grown as an ornamental and to some extent for perfume oils
- Salvia spathacea: California hummingbird sage, pitcher sage; ornamental, fruit-scented with rose pink flowers
- Salvia splendens: scarlet sage; popular tender ornamental bedding or pot plant.
- Salvia uliginosa: bog sage; herbaceous perennial, blue flowers

== Ecology ==
=== Herbivory ===
Salvia species are used as food plants by the larvae of some Lepidoptera (butterfly and moth) species including the bucculatricid leaf-miner Bucculatrix taeniola which feeds exclusively on the genus and the Coleophora case-bearers C. aegyptiacae, C. salviella (both feed exclusively on Salvia aegyptiaca), C. ornatipennella and C. virgatella (both recorded on Salvia pratensis).

=== Habitat ===
They have a broad range of habitats, including deserts, dry shrub-lands, deciduous woodlands, pine-oak woodlands, and submontane ever wet forests. Most prefer sunny or semi-shaded conditions and few species are frost-tolerant. Their most common environment is black soil by stream banks where they are partially shaded with high humidity.

== Hybrids ==
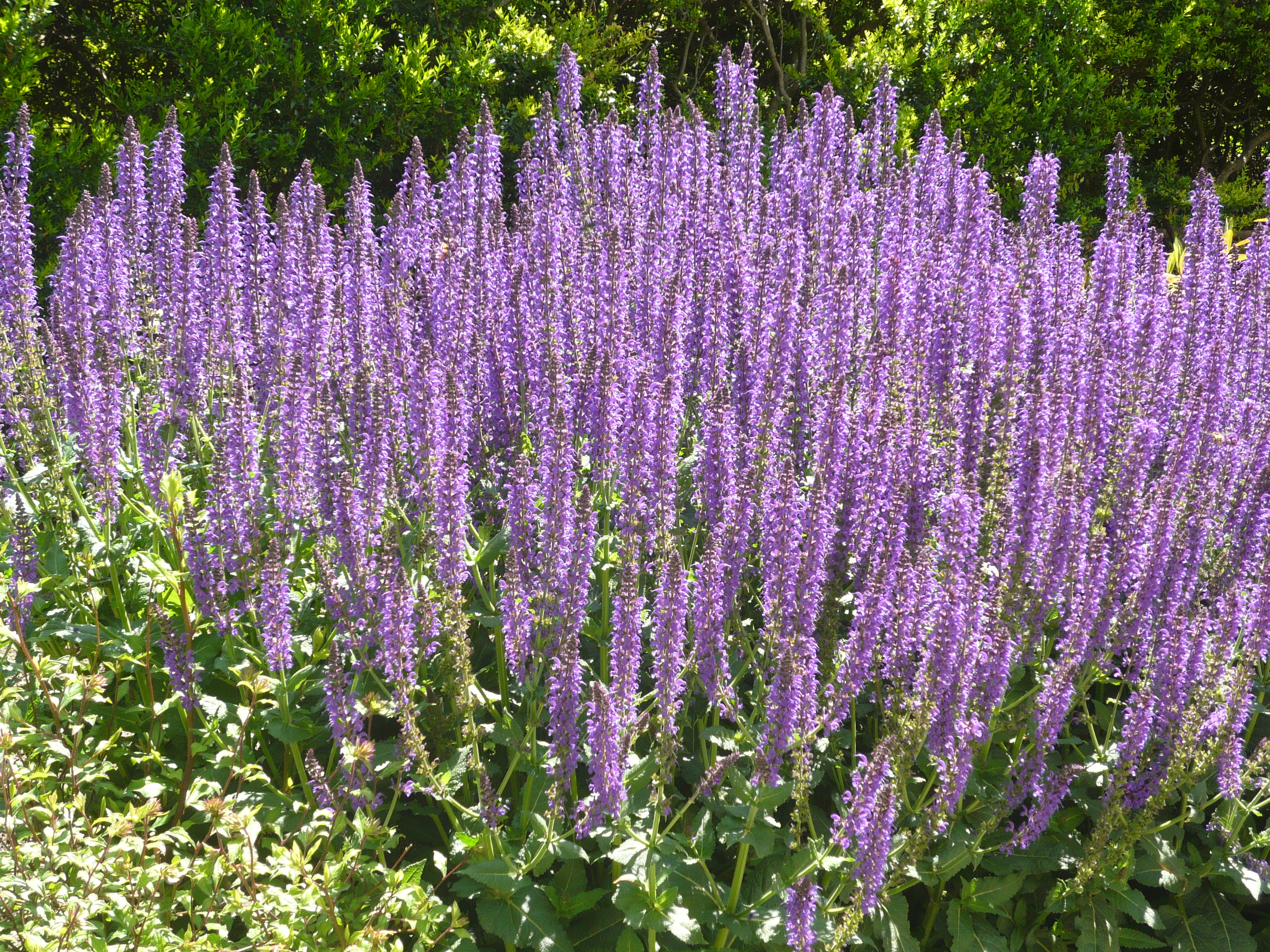
Salvia × sylvestris 'Mainacht'

Many interspecific hybrids occur naturally, with a relatively high degree of crossability, but some, Salvia fruticosa × Salvia tomentosa, have been intentional. A natural hybrid, Salvia longispicata × Salvia farinacea has given rise to a series of popular ornamentals such as Salvia 'Indigo Spires' and Salvia Mystic Spires Blue 'Balsalmisp'.

=== AGM cultivars ===
Numerous garden-worthy cultivars and varieties have been produced, often with mixed or unknown parentage. The following have gained the Royal Horticultural Society's Award of Garden Merit:

- Salvia 'Amistad': bushy upright perennial, deep blue/purple flowers
- Salvia 'Dyson's Joy': small, bushy perennial, bicolor red/pink flowers
- Salvia 'Hot Lips': bushy evergreen, red/white flowers
- Salvia 'Jezebel': bushy evergreen perennial, red flowers
- Salvia 'Nachtvlinder': bushy evergreen perennial, purple flowers
- Salvia 'Ribambelle': bushy perennial, salmon-pink flowers
- Salvia 'Royal Bumble': evergreen shrub, red flowers
- Salvia × jamensis 'Javier': bushy perennial, purple flowers
- Salvia × jamensis 'Los Lirios': bushy shrub, pink flowers
- Salvia × jamensis 'Peter Vidgeon': bushy perennial, pale pink flowers
- Salvia × jamensis 'Raspberry Royale': evergreen subshrub, raspberry pink flowers
- Salvia × superba 'Rubin': clump-forming perennial, pale pink flowers
- Salvia × sylvestris 'Blauhügel': herbaceous perennial, violet-blue flowers
- Salvia × sylvestris 'Mainacht': compact perennial, deep violet flowers
- Salvia × sylvestris 'Tänzerin': perennial, purple flowers

== Bibliography ==
- Sage: The Genus Salvia by Spiridon E. Kintzios, CRC Press, 2000. ISBN 978-90-5823-005-8.
- The Gardener's Guide to Growing Salvias by John Sutton, Timber Press, 1999. ISBN 978-0-88192-474-9.
- Clebsch, Betsy; Barner, Carol D. (2003). The New Book of Salvias. Timber Press. ISBN 978-0-88192-560-9.
- Tychonievich, Joseph; Warner, Ryan M. (January 2011). "Interspecific Crossability of Selected Salvia Species and Potential Use for Crop Improvement". Journal of the American Society for Horticultural Science. 136 (1): 4147. doi:10.21273/JASHS.136.1.41.
