= Traditional Chinese medicines derived from the human body =

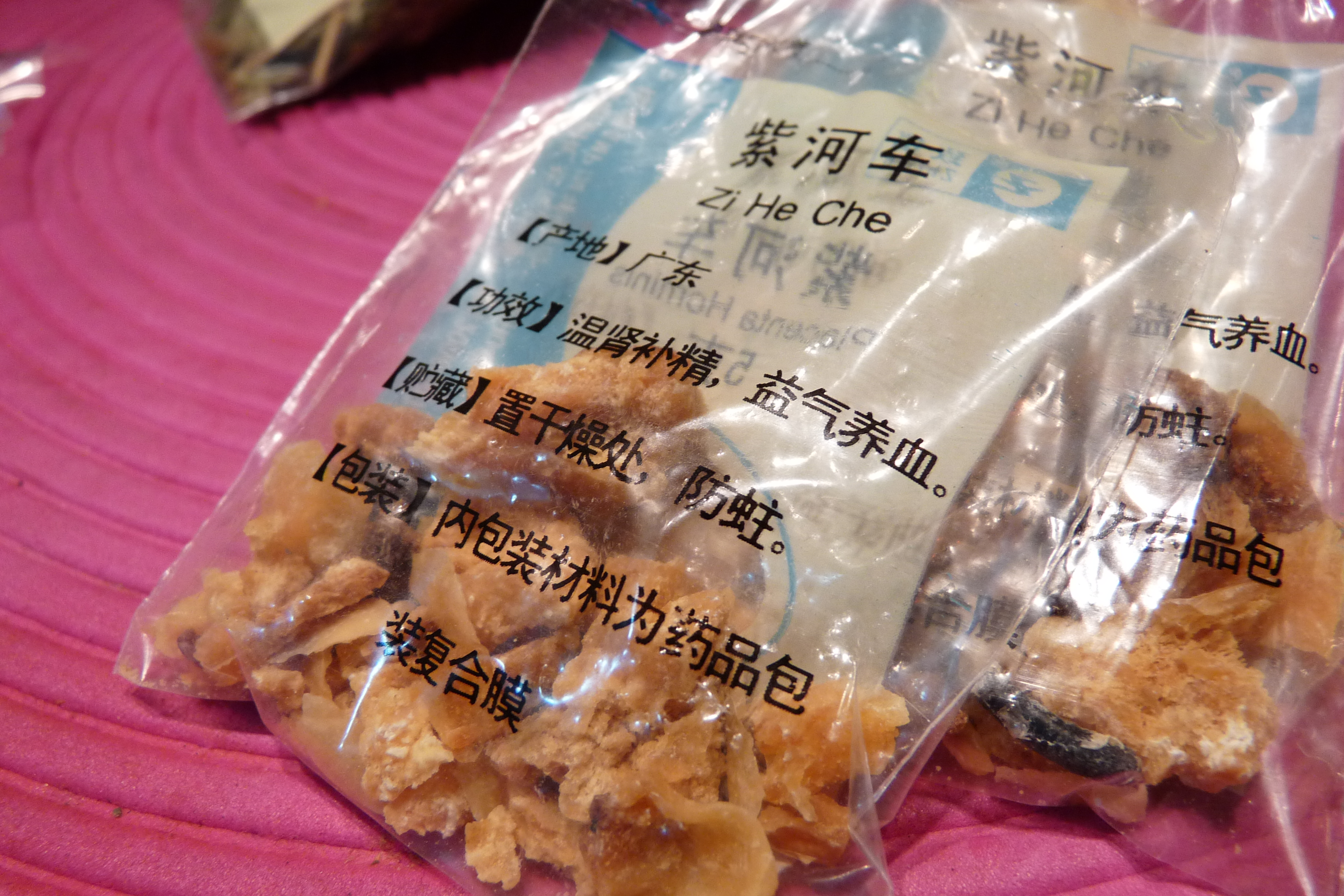
Modern Chinese medicinal zǐhéchē 紫河车 "dried human placenta"

Li Shizhen's (1597) Bencao gangmu, the classic materia medica of traditional Chinese medicine (TCM), included 35 human drugs, including organs, bodily fluids, and excreta. Crude drugs derived from the human body were commonplace in the early history of medicine. Some of these TCM human drug usages are familiar from alternative medicine, such as medicinal breast milk and urine therapy. Others are uncommon, such as the "mellified man", which was a western nostrum allegedly prepared from the mummy of a holy man who only ate honey during his last days and whose corpse had been immersed in honey for 100 years. Li condemned the usage of most items listed in the section.

== Historical background ==
Chinese herbalists and doctors have used medicines from the human body for over two millennia. The earliest known example is the 168 BCE Wushier bingfang medical text that prescribes using ingredients such as hair, fingernail, and nüzǐbù (女子布, "women's [menstrual] cloth").

== Contents ==
Li Shizhen's (1518-1593) magnum opus, the Bencao gangmu or "Compendium of Materia Medica" is still one of the traditional Chinese physician's standard reference books.

Chapter 52 Renbu 人部 "human section" is classified under the fourth category of animals (兽之四), and is the last chapter in the Bencao gangmu. Li's preface explains this internal ordering, "At the beginning, I have placed the waters and fires, followed by the soils. ... They are followed by the worms, scaly animals and crustaceans, fowl and quadruped; and man concludes the list. From the low I have ascended to the noble."

The human-drug chapter contains 37 entries (zhǒng 種 "kind; type"). Unlike the first 35 that discuss human pharmaceuticals and drug prescriptions, the last two are only recorded "for doctors as a reference" Number 36 "Human beings from different locations" discusses personal influences from astrology, environment, geography, and climate (perhaps historical climatology in modern terms). Number 37 "Human beings in extraordinary conditions and of odd forms" ranges across cosmology, male and female sterility, pregnancy, hermaphroditism, metamorphosis, evolution, and monsters.

Human drugs in Bencao gangmu
No.	Pinyin	Characters	Translation	Prescriptions
52.1	Fàbèi	髮髲	Human hair (cut off a head)	6
52.2	Luànfà	亂髮	Human hair (collected from a comb)	41
52.3	Tóugòu	頭垢	Human dandruff	24
52.4	Ĕrsāi	耳塞	Human earwax	6
52.5	Xīgòu	膝垢	Human knee dirt	0
52.6	Zhǎojiǎ	爪甲	Human nails (from fingers and toes)	20
52.7	Yáchǐ	牙齒	Human teeth	8
52.8	Rénshǐ	人屎	Human feces	33
52.9	Xiǎo'ér tāishǐ	小兒胎屎	Human feces from a newborn (meconium)	0
52.10	Rénniào	人尿	Human urine	45
52.11	Nìbáiyìn	溺白垽	White sediment of human urine	15
52.12	Qiūshí	秋石	Processed white sediment of human urine	12
52.13	Línshí	淋石	Human urinary stone (calculus)	0
52.14	Pǐshí	癖石	Human gallstone (?)	0
52.15	Rǔzhī	乳汁	Human milk	15
52.16	Fùrén yuèshuǐ	婦人月水	Human menstrual blood	12
52.17	Rénxuè	人血	Human blood	7
52.18	Rénjīng	人精	Human semen	5
52.19	Kǒujīntuò	口津唾	Human saliva	4
52.20	Chǐyìn	齒垽	Human tartar	2
52.21	Rénhàn	人汗	Human perspiration	0
52.22	Yǎnlèi	眼淚	Human tears	0
52.23	Rénqì	人氣	Human breath	0
52.24	Rénpò	人魄	Human ghost (of a hanged person)	0
52.25	Zīxū	髭鬚	Human facial hair	0
52.26	Yīnmáo	陰毛	Human pubic hair	2
52.27	Réngǔ	人骨	Human bone	4
52.28	Tiānlínggài	天靈蓋	Human bregma	11
52.29	Rénbāo	人胞	Human placenta	7
52.30	Bāoyīshuǐ	胞衣水	Processed fluid of human placenta	0
52.31	Chūshēng qídài	初生臍帶	Human umbilical cord	3
52.32	Rénshì	人勢	Human penis	0
52.33	Réndǎn	人膽	Human gall bladder	3
52.34	Rénròu	人肉	Human flesh	0
52.35	Mùnǎiyī	木乃伊	Human mummy (mellified man)	0
52.36	Fāngmín	方民	Human beings from different locations	0
52.37	Rénguī	人傀	Human beings in extraordinary forms	0

Some of these Bencao gangmu human drug names use obscure classical Chinese terms. Chǐyìn 齒垽 "tartar; dental calculus; plaque" (52.20) uses the rare name yìn 垽 "sediment: dregs" instead of gòu 垢 "filth" in the common yágòu 牙垢. Renshi 人勢 "penis" (52.32) uses shì 勢 "power; circumstance" in the archaic sense of "male genitals" seen in qùshì 去勢 "castrate; emasculate".

While most names of these 35 Chinese "human drugs" (translated as hair, dandruff, and earwax) are understandable, several culture-specific terms need explanation.

Li Shizhen distinguishes drugs from four types of human hair: 52.1 fàbèi "(esp. boy's) hair cut from the head", 52.2 luànfà 亂髮 "hair left on a comb after using it", 52.25 zīxū 髭鬚 "facial hair", and 52.26 yīnmáo 陰毛 "pubic hair". Li details additional names and their corresponding pulse diagnosis acupuncture channels.

Hair from different positions is given different names: Hair on the head, called Fa [髮] (hair), pertains to Kidney Channel of Foot Lesser Yin and Stomach Channel of Foot Greater Yang. Hair in front of the ears, called Bin [鬢] (temples), pertains to Sanjiao Channel of Hand Lesser Yang and Gall Bladder Channel of Foot Lesser Yang. Hair above the eyes, called Mei [眉] (eyebrow), pertains to Large Intestine Channel of Hand Greater Yang and Stomach Channel of Foot Greater Yang. Hair on the upper lip, called Zi [髭] (moustache), pertains to Large Intestine Channel of Hand Greater Yang. Hair under the chin, called Xu [鬚] (beard), pertains to Gall Bladder Channel of Foot Lesser Yang and Stomach Channel of Foot Greater Yang. Hair on the cheeks, called Ran [髯] (whiskers), pertains to Gall Bladder Channel of Foot Lesser Yang. (52.2)

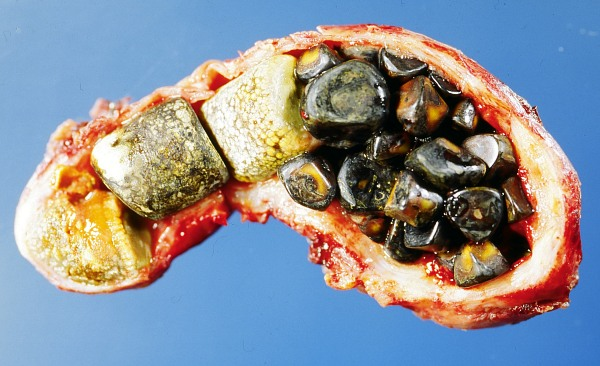
Gallstones in a gall bladder

The obscure drug 52.14 pǐshí 癖石, translated as "gall-stones", "gallstones", and described as "hard masses formed from extraordinary addiction or devotion", combines words meaning "craving; addiction; extreme devotion; idiosyncrasy; indigestion" and "stone; rock". Li Shizhen explains, "If a person is especially devoted to a certain habit or thing, or when a person is suffering from the formation of hard masses, a strange thing will take shape." Li gives examples of similar things "formed due to congelation of a kind of essence substance": niúhuáng 牛黄 "ox bezoar; calculus bovis", gǒubǎo 狗寶 "stone in a dog's kidney/gall bladder", zhǎdá 鮓答 "white stone that forms between the liver and gall of livestock, used for rain prayers", and shèlìzi 舍利子 "śarīra; a Buddhist relic supposedly found in cremated ashes".

Medicinal 52.18 rénjīng 人精 "human semen" includes both male and female jīngyè 精液, meaning male "seminal fluid; semen" and female "vaginal lubrication". (Note: Alternatively, female jīngyè could refer to female ejaculation, as surviving Taoist texts that refer to medicinally-used female coital fluids as "Black Lead" also maintain that attaining a woman's qi requires her reaching orgasm.) Read (1931: no. 425) notes the (c. 1550 BCE) Ebers Papyrus refers to both male and female semen. Li Shizhen says,

The essence substance of Ying (nutrient essence in blood [營]) can be transformed into semen [精] and gathered at the Mingmen (Gate of Life), which is the house of Jing (Vital Essence [精]) and blood. When a boy is 16 years old, the volume of his semen is one sheng and six ge [over 1.5 liters]. If it is well protected, it will accumulate to three sheng [nearly 5 liters]. If it is not protected and is exhausted too quickly, less than a sheng of it can be retained. Without blood, semen cannot form. Semen is a treasured thing within the body and is well nourished by qi (Vital Energy). Therefore, when blood is at its full capacity, the amount of semen will be increased. When qi (Vital Energy) accumulates, semen becomes overfilled. Evil alchemists [邪術家] fool stupid maidens and mate with them. Then they drink the vaginal secretions of the girls [女精液]. Or they blend their own semen with the menstrual blood of a maiden and eat it. This mixture is called Qiangong [鉛汞] (lead and mercury). They consider this a treasured drug and indulge in sex excessively, eating such a foul thing. This practice will shorten their lifespans greatly. What a stupid thing!

Both 52.12 qiūshí 秋石 "processed white sediment of human urine with salt" and 52.30 bāoyīshuǐ 胞衣水 "processed fluid of human placenta" specify particular methods of iatrochemical or medical-chemical preparation.

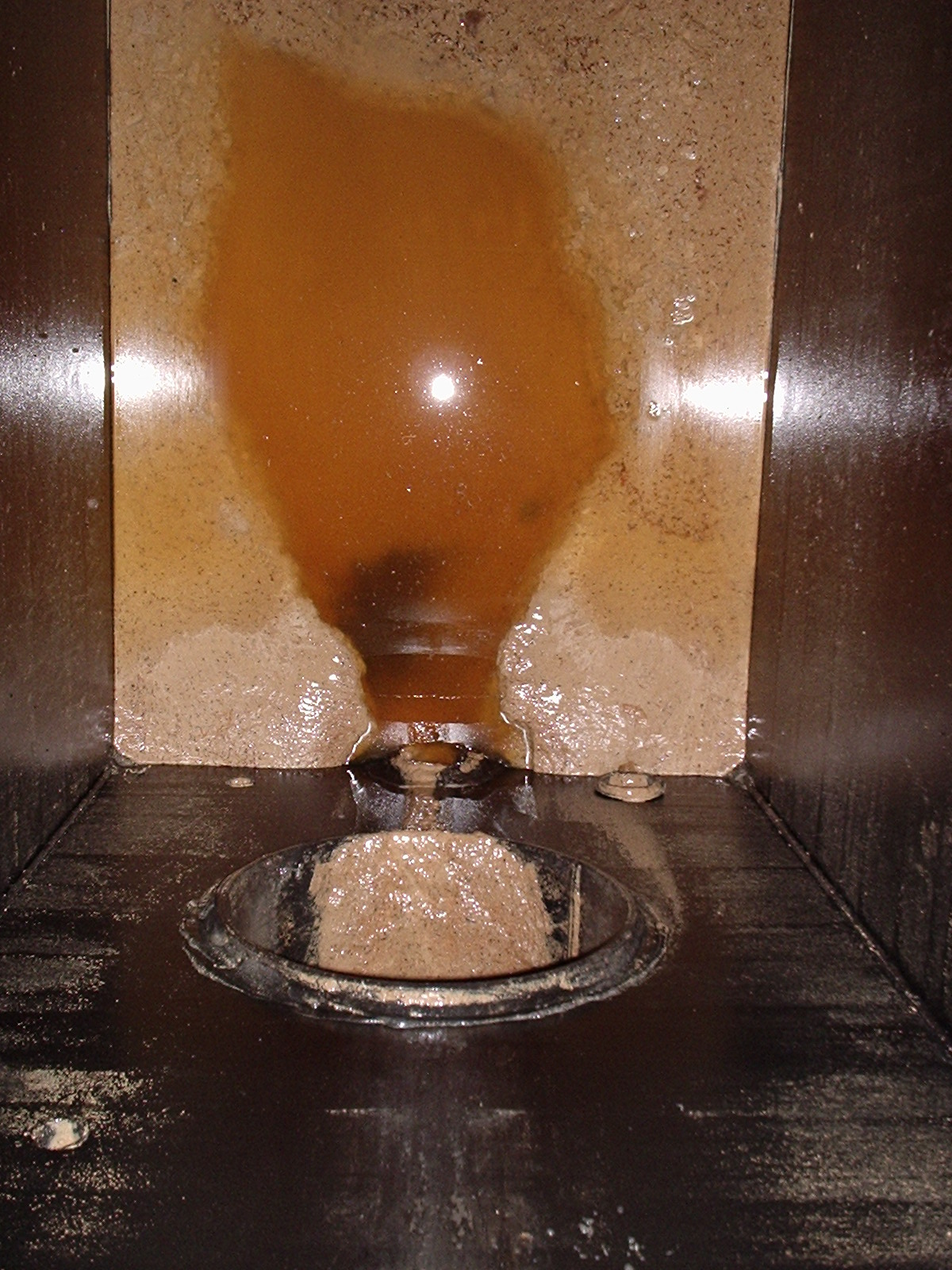
Urine precipitate in a tank collecting urine from urine diversion flush toilets in Germany

Qiūshí 秋石 (lit. "autumn mineral"), translated as "urea" and "processed white sediment of human urine with salt" (Luo), was prepared from 52.11 nibaiyin "white urinary sediment" from the urine of either Yin girls or Yang boys. The qiushi drug was called qiūbīng 秋冰 (lit. "autumn ice") after recrystallization, similar to boiling seawater to get salt. Li Shenzhen warns that, "Some alchemists fake the product by calcining salt in a furnace. Any substance alleged to be Qiubing should be examined carefully to make sure it is genuine." Li Shizhen outlines historical changes in the use of steroid-rich urine drugs. In ancient times, doctors used urinary precipitates to "keep the blood in motion, greatly help sexual debility, bring down heat, kill parasites, and disperse poisons; but the princes and wealthy patricians disliked using it because they considered it unhygienic. So the iatro-chemists ([fangshi]) began to purify the sediment, making first [qiushi] and later on [qiubing]", which licentious people used as aphrodisiacs. The Bencao gangmu lists six methods of processing qiushi through techniques including dilution, precipitation, filtration, evaporation, calcination, and sublimation.

Bāoyīshuǐ 胞衣水, translated as "old liquefied placenta" and "fluid of human placenta", was traditionally processed in two ways. In north China, people bury a human placenta in the ground for 7 to 8 years, and it dissolves into a fluid that is as clean as ice. In south China, people blend human placenta with gāncǎo 甘草 "Glycyrrhiza uralensis; Chinese licorice root", shēngmá 升麻 "Cimicifuga simplex; bugbane", and other drugs, which they store in a bottle, and bury in the ground for 3 to 5 years. Then they dig it up and use it medicinally.

The 52.24 rénpò 人魄 "Human ghost (of a hanged person)" medicine refers to Chinese hun and po soul dualism between the hun 魂 "spiritual, ethereal, yang soul" that leaves the body after death and the po 魄 "corporeal, substantive, yin soul" that remains with the corpse. Li Shizhen explains, "Renpo is found in the soil under a person who has hanged himself or herself. It resembles soft charcoal. If the Renpo is not dug out in time, it will penetrate deep into the earth where it cannot be traced." The Bencao gangmu compares a hanged person's soul with similar phenomena, "When a star descends to the earth it turns into a stone. When a tiger dies, his eyesight descends and turns into a white stone. Human blood will turn into phosphorus or jade when it drops to the ground." Li only gives one prescription, "Renpo pacifies the Heart and tranquilizes the soul and boldness. It treats convulsions, fright, and manic-depressive psychosis. Grind Renpo with water and take it by mouth."

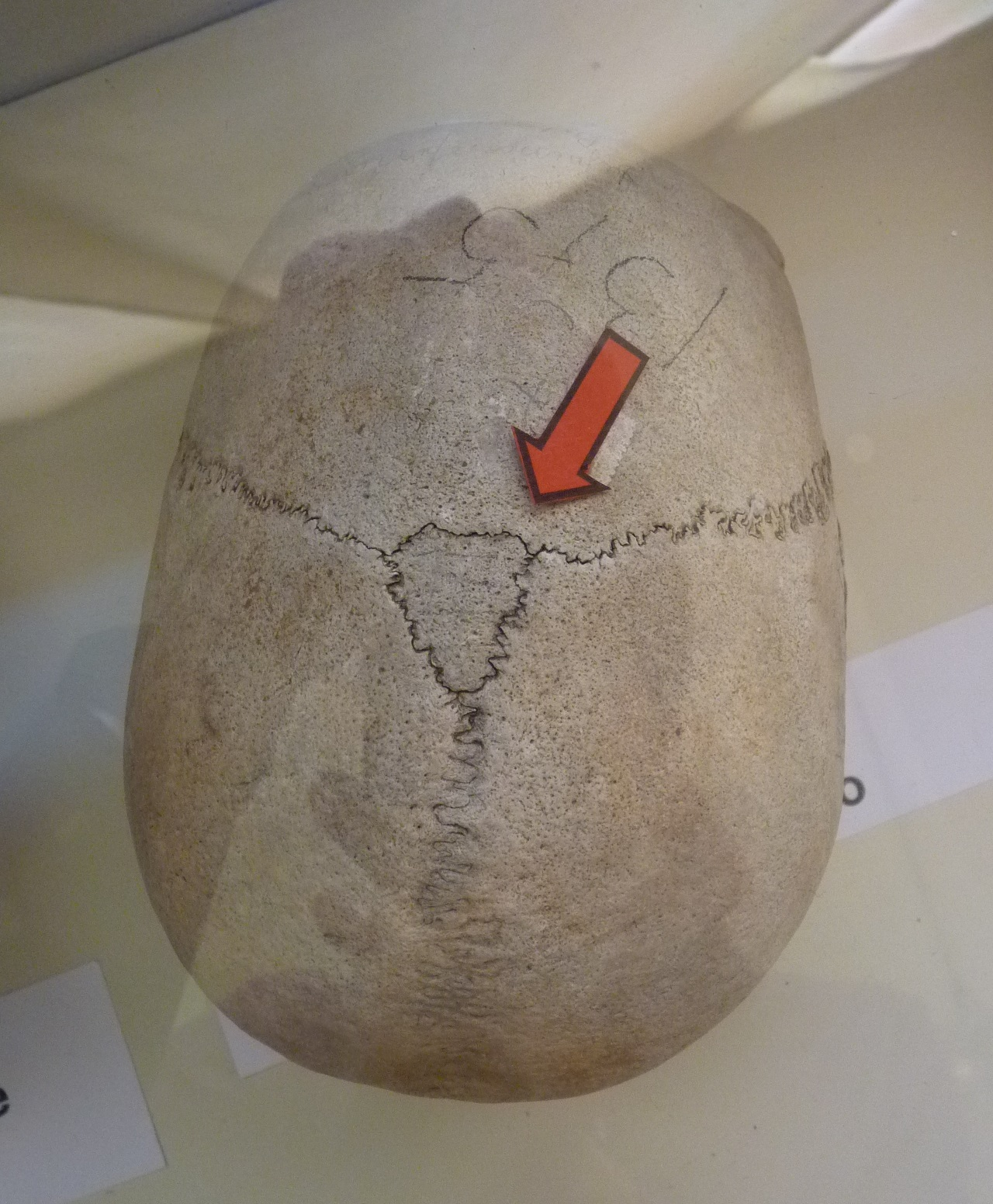
Human skull showing bregma

52.28 Tiānlínggài 天靈蓋 "bregma; skullcap; calvaria" is translated as "human skull", "human skull top", and "bregma". In Daoist meditation and qigong breathing practices, the bregma is considered the locus of the upper dantian "elixir field". Li Shizhen says, "The skull of a human looks like a round cover. It is shaped like the sky. It is the palace of Niwan" – níwán 泥丸 "clay pellet" is a Chinese transcription of "nirvana". Furthermore, "It is a place where ancestral wisdom is stored. Taoist alchemists stimulate the Li (Fire) by Kan (Water) so as to restore its condition of pure Qian (Yang). In this way, a sacred fetus will form. Then it may go out and come back in as it wishes. So the top of the skull is called Tianlinggai (meaning "cover of the Heavenly wisdom")." This shèngtāi 聖胎 "sacred embryo/fetus; Embryo of Sainthood" denotes achieving xian immortality through neidan "internal alchemy". Cooper & Sivin say drilling the skull in order to provide a passage is still part of the initiation ritual for members of the esoteric Shingon sect in Taiwan today.

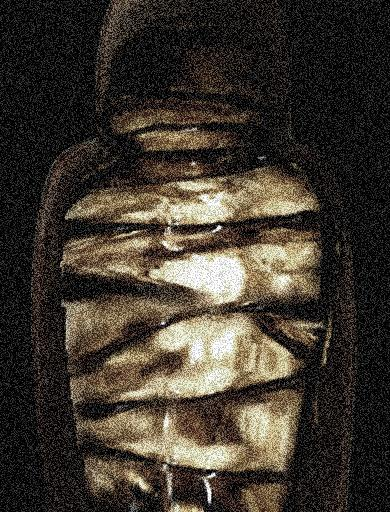
Mellified man (artistic impression)

The 52.35 mùnǎiyī 木乃伊 "mummy; mellified man" drug was not a Chinese drug and came from Tianfangguo (lit. 天方國 "Kaaba countries"), which was an archaic name for "Arabia; Middle East". Li Shizhen recounts this foreign legend and expresses skepticism,

The book Chuogeng Lu by Tao Jiucheng: It is recorded that in the Tianfang country there was an old man 70 or 80 years old was willing to sacrifice his body for the general public. So he stopped taking any food except for drinking honey daily. He washed himself repeatedly. After a month, his stools and urine all turned into honey. After his death, people in the country kept him in a stone coffin filled with honey. The date was inscribed on the stone coffin and it was buried in the ground. After 100 years, the body became a kind of honey-preserved thing that was used as a drug. When someone was suffering from an injury to his body, including bone fractures, a little of the "honey man" could be taken as a drug. It worked right away. Even in that country, this was something very precious. It was called "honey man. The above is quoted from Tao Jiucheng's book. It is not known whether this is true or not. So it is recorded at the end of this section for further study.

Read says Burmese priests have the custom of preserving their chief abbots in coffins full of honey.

Among this total content of 35 entries with 287 prescriptions, 13 human drugs with 217 prescriptions first appeared in the Bencao gangmu while 22 types with 67 prescriptions came from earlier Chinese materia medica: 1 from the Eastern Han dynasty (25-220) Shennong bencaojing; 5 from the Liang dynasty (502-557) Mingyi bielu; 9 from the Tang dynasty (618-907) Xinxiu bencao and Bencao shiyi; 8 from Song dynasty (960-1279) texts Da Ming rihua bencao, Kaibao bencao, Jiayou bencao, and Zhenglei bencao; and 1 other from the Ming dynasty (1368-1644) Bencao mengquan. A few Bencao gangmu prescriptions are cited from non-medical literature, such as Zhang Hua's (c. 290) Bowuzhi "Record of Wide Knowledge" collection of wonders (but this magical marital formula is not found in the current reconstituted version). Prescription 52.16.5, "To keep one's wife from being jealous. Wrap a toad in the cloth the wife uses to absorb her menses 婦人月水布 and bury it five [cun] (15 cm) deep, one [chi] (31 cm) in front of the privy."

Since more than one-third of the human drugs were first added in Li Shizhen's time, suggested that "research into the origin of these relatively recent remedies which may reveal a new interchange of thought and practice between China and other civilizations. It may have been that the Arabs were in this matter a common source of both Chinese and European medicine."

== Sample entry ==
Bencao gangmu drug entries typically give the name used in the earliest materia medica reference, synonyms, explanations from earlier authors, information about preparing the drug, indications, effects, and prescriptions. As an example of these human drug entries, compare Read's partial summary and Luo's full translation of 52.26.

433. 陰毛 YIN MAO. PUBIC HAIR (M & F).

Shih-Yi: Pubic hair of the male is used for snake bite. Twelve [sic] hairs held in the mouth and sucked will keep the poison from entering the viscera.

For difficult labour, 14 hairs from the husband ashed and taken with lard in the form of a pill.

Pubic hair from the female is used to treat gonorrhea and sexual diseases. Also for swollen belly in the cow.

This "Shih-Yi" abbreviates Chen Cangqi's (c. 720) Bencao Shiyi 本草拾遺 "Supplement to Materia Medica". Read translates yinyangyibing 陰陽易病 (lit. "yin-yang exchange disorders") as "gonorrhea and sexual diseases", compare Luo's "febrile disease transmitted by sex" below. According to Cooper & Sivin, yinyangyi is a general name for "illnesses contracted through sexual intercourse with someone who has just recovered from them", which are diagnosed by the appearance of a yang pulse on the wrist under conditions in which a yin pulse is normally read, and vice versa.

CLAUSE 52-26 YINMAO

Human pubic hair – Bencao Shiyi (Supplement to Materia Medica by Chen Cangqi).

[Indications]

Chen Cangqi: Male pubic hair is a good antidote for snake bite. Hold 20 strands of pubic hair in the mouth, and swallow the juice. This will prevent the snake's toxin from entering the abdomen.

Human pubic hair is good for treating dystocia with transverse or footling presentation. Burn 14 pieces of pubic hair of the patient's husband, blend the residue with pig lard, and make into pills the size of soy beans. Swallow the pills. – Qiaijin Yaofang (Essential Prescriptions worth a Thousand Gold).

Li Shizhen: Female pubic hair is good for treating stranguria of five types and the Yinyangyi syndrome (febrile disease transmitted by sex).

[Prescriptions] Two prescriptions collected recently.

Prescription 52.26.1: To treat the Yinyangyi syndrome (febrile disease transmitted by sex): After a man has just recovered from a serious disease, and he has sex too soon, his scrotum will become swollen and will shrink into his abdomen. This will be accompanied by severe colic. Burn female pubic hair into ash and take it by mouth right away. Also drink water in which female genitalia have been washed. – Puji Fang (Prescriptions for Universal Relief).

Prescription 52.26.2: To treat an ox that is dying from the effects of a distended abdomen: Wrap female pubic hair in straw and feed it to the ox. This will work. – Waitai Miyao (Medical Secrets of an Official).

Luo explains translating "Clause" instead of "Drug" in chapter 52: "As most of the "drugs" from human being are no more used medically, it seems rude to list them as drugs." Note the medical terms dystocia "A slow or difficult labor or delivery" and stranguria (i.e., strangury "A painful, frequent need to urinate, when the bladder is largely empty or with little urine production").

== Moral aspects ==
Reflecting the well-known Confucianist inhibition against mutilating one's body, Li Shizhen's preface to chapter 52 ethically condemns the use of some human drugs.

The human is a different species from all the other organisms used as sources of drugs. In later times, Taoist alchemists [方伎之士] considered that many parts of the human body should be used as drugs, such as bone, flesh, and gall. This is really very rude and inhuman. In the present category, all parts of the human body that have been used as drugs are recorded. The use of drugs from the human body that is not contrary to morality is recorded in detail. Those drugs that are cruel or foul [慘忍邪穢] are not recorded in detail. But all of them are listed in this category.

Li does not give prescriptions for 12 of the 35 human drugs, which he considered "cruel or foul".

Li Shizhen sharply criticized medicinal usage of bone and flesh.

In ancient times, people thought it a benevolent deed to bury discarded human bones. Such people thought that they would be rewarded with good. But some alchemists [方伎] collect human bones and use them as a drug with the hope of making a profit from them. Should this be done to those who save people from diseases? Even dogs do not eat the bones of dogs. Why should a human eat the bones of other humans? (52.27)

Under the 52.34 human flesh entry, Li denounces two earlier pharmacopeias. Chen Cangqi's (early 8th century) Bencao Shiyi prescribes flesh as a good drug for láozhài 癆瘵 "consumptive and infectious diseases", and Li Shizhen says, "Our bodies, skin, and hair are inherited from our parents and should be well protected. Even when parents are seriously ill, how can they bear to eat the flesh of their offspring? This is a practice followed only by stupid, foolish folk." Li Shizhen quotes Tao Zongyi's Chuogeng Lu (14th century): "In ancient and present-day warfare, soldiers have eaten human flesh, calling it Xiangrou (meaning 'imagine it as meat') or Liangjiaoyang (meaning 'meat of sheep with two legs')". He comments: "This is done by bandits and thieves without human hearts. Such damned villains!"

For such a renowned physician and herbalist, Li Shizhen was sometimes credulous. The "penis" entry (52.32) gives the common term yīnjīng 陰莖 "Yin stalk" and says,

Li Shizhen: A man's penis is not a drug. The book Chuogeng Lu by Tao Jiucheng: Mr. Shen in Hangzhou was once caught in the act of raping a woman. He cut off part of his penis as a self-punishment. But the wound bled incessantly and did not heal for a month thereafter. Someone told him to find the amputated part of his penis. He found it, pounded it into powder, and took the powder by mouth with wine. After a few days, the wound healed. This might be a useful reference to those whose genitals are physically damaged. So it is recorded here for reference.

Luo's "those whose genitals are physically damaged" euphemistically translates the original metaphor cánshì 蠶室 "silkworm nursery; (traditional) prison where the punishment of castration was inflicted". Compare Cooper & Sivin's version, "Contemplating this story, it would seem that those 'who go down to the silkworm room' [who are administratively sentenced to castration] should not be ignorant of this method, so I append it here."

In some Bencao gangmu contexts concerning human drugs, Li Shizhen would accept the traditional theory but deny the contemporary practice. Under the human breath or qi section (52.23), Li says a "very effective" method for treating an elderly person who is suffering from cold and deficiency in the lower body is to have a boy or girl blow air through a cloth into the navel. However, he notes that contemporary "Taoist alchemists [術家] have advocated the following way of using this energy. Let a maiden breathe air into the nostrils, umbilicus, and penis of an old man. This will provide a connection between the three Dantians (the elixir fields at the upper, middle and lower regions of the body)." Li Shizhen moralistically warns, "This is a small skill practiced by alchemists. If this is not done exactly as stipulated, such practice can only bring harm to the person."

== Scientific analysis ==
Lu Gwei-djen and Joseph Needham, historians of science and technology in China, analyzed urinary steroid hormones in the first serious scientific study of Chinese human drugs. They researched early references to the concentrated sex hormone preparations (52.11) nibaiyin 溺白垽 "white urinary sediment" and (52.12) qiushi 秋石 "processed urinary sediment", which Li Shizhen says were respectively first recorded in the (659) Xinxiu bencao and in the (1567) Bencao mengchuan materia medica. The Chinese use of urine as a medicine, especially for impotence and other sexual disorders, has a long history. The Book of the Later Han described three Daoist fangshi "adepts; magicians" who lived in the late 2nd century; Gan Shi 甘始, Dongguo Yannian 東郭延年, and Feng Junda 封君達 "were all expert at following the techniques of [Rong Cheng 容成, a semi-legendary figure associated with sexual physiology] in commerce with women. They could also drink urine and sometimes used to hang upside down. They were careful and sparing of their seminal essence and (inherited) [qi], and they did not boast with great words of their powers." Based upon the Bencao gangmu list of six methods processing urine to produce qiushi, Lu & Needham conclude that from the 11th century onwards, Chinese alchemists, physicians, and iatro-chemists were successfully making quasi-empirical preparations of active substances with androgens and estrogens, a technique that modern biochemists did not develop until the early 20th century.

The physician William C. Cooper and the sinologist Nathan Sivin chose what the Chinese call rényào 人藥 "human drugs" as a pilot experiment sample for pharmacologically analyzing the efficacy of drugs used in TCM. In contrast to many traditional Chinese plant, animal, and mineral pharmaceuticals with uncertain active constituents, the chemical composition of the human body and parts is well known, and "their therapeutic effectiveness, or lack of it, can be objectively, if approximately, estimated without reference to their Chinese context.". They selected 8 widely used human drugs from the 37 listed in Bencao gangmu chapter 52: human hair, nails, teeth, milk, blood, semen, saliva, and bone. For each substance, Cooper and Sivin first analyzed the Bencao gangmu information about drug preparation and use, and then commented on the known chemical composition of the human drug and other ingredients in the prescriptions.

Cooper & Sivin applied the criteria of clinical pharmacology to analyze the possible medicinal value of the Bencao gangmu pharmacopeia's human drug prescriptions for 66 diseases, 58 (88%) of which prescribe one or more ancillary ingredients. Fifty (76%) diseases treated would not have been relieved strictly by known properties of the prescription constituents or their combinations, and the other sixteen (24%) diseases might possibly be benefited from the human drug, another ingredient, or their synergistic combination.

These 24% conceivably beneficial human drug prescriptions can be divided into positive and possible types. First, positive specific benefits for the ailments could come from effects of three (5%) human drug prescriptions alone (all for human blood, e.g., 52.17.3 drink blood mixed with water for internal hemorrhage from wounds, two (3%) ancillary ingredients alone (52.15.11 [not breast milk but] desiccant tung oil is "miraculously effective" for calf sores, 1973: 233). Second, uncertain or nonspecific therapeutic benefits include five human drugs (e.g., 52.6.14 powdered left-hand fingernails and rush pith form a sticky mass applied to the canthus for removing foreign bodies in the eye, three (5%) ancillary ingredients (52.6.11 pack and roast a silkworm cocoon with a man's fingernail trimmings and a boy's hair for ulcerated hemorrhoids, and three combinations of them (52.15.7 human milk and copper coins cooked in a copper vessel for trachoma could form copper sulfate, which has a mild antibacterial effect for eye infections.

The authors conclude that less than 8% of all these disorders could have been "positively cured by known pharmacological effects of the remedies cited", and raise the question of psychosomatic or social effects of human drugs in folk medicine.

== Ritual aspects ==
Having demonstrated that the effectiveness of most Bencao gangmu human drug prescriptions was not attributable to pharmacognosy, Cooper & Sivin examined whether the symbolic aspects of magic and ritual in Chinese folk medicine could explain why pharmacopoeias continue to list human drugs. Within their sample of 8 human drugs, prescriptions mention two dozen symbolic ritual procedures. Sympathetic magic, for example, could explain using blood to treat blood loss (52.17.3 above) and attempting to treat bone damage with bone (52.27.1). Li Shizhen quotes the (9th century) Miscellaneous Morsels from Youyang.

The book Youyang Zaju: Once a military man in Jingzhou had an injured tibia. Doctor Zhang Qizheng treated him with a kind of medicinal wine, which was taken orally. A small segment of broken bone in the wounded tibia was taken out and a kind of medicinal ointment was applied externally. The injury was cured. The patient kept the small piece of bone from his tibia under his bed. But two years later there was a recurrence. Doctor Zhang said that the bone from the tibia was cold now. He searched for the bone and found it under the man's bed. He washed the bone with hot water, wrapped it in silk fabric, and kept in a good place. After that the pain was gone. This shows the interrelationship between the bone left under the bed and the pain. How can we say a withered bone has no sense? People should be aware of this.

Prescription 52.27.4 specifies using a dead child's bone: "To treat bone fractures: Bone of infant, calcined, and muskmelon seed, stir-fried. Grind the above ingredients into powder, and take the powder by mouth with good wine. It stops the pain right away."

Demonic possession and demonic medicine are ancient Chinese beliefs. For example, the Bencao gangmu (52.28) says "bregma; skull bone" is good for treating several tuberculosis-like diseases that are supposedly caused by evil spirits. The (sometimes synonymous) names of these sicknesses are difficult to translate, as shown by the following renderings by Cooper & Sivin, Luo, and Zhang & Unschuld:

- chuánshī 傳尸 "cadaver vector disease", "consumptive and infectious disease", "corpse [evil] transmission"
- shīzhù 尸疰 "cadaver fixation disease", "consumptive and infectious disease", "corpse attachment-illness"
- gǔzhēng 骨蒸 "bone-steaming disease", "consumptive disease with general debility", "bone steaming"
- guǐ[qì]zhù 鬼[氣]疰 [no 1973 translation], "consumptive disease of unknown cause", "demon [qi] attachment-illness"

Li Shizhen quotes Chen Cangqi's explanation that when a piece of skull is cleaned, simmered in a young boy's urine, and then buried in a pit, "This will infuse the drug with a soul". Li also quotes Yang Shiying that the shizhu disease "is caused by a ghost that hides within a person's body and does not come out. So the disease is a prolonged one. When treated with human skull top, the ghost's soul will be dispelled from the person's body and the syndrome may subside." Cooper & Sivin note that the guzheng "bone-steaming disease" or chuanshi "cadaver vector disease", "passes from one member of a family to another, sapping their strength and killing them in turn. The name comes from the patient's feeling of feverishness ("steaming") in the marrow of his bones. The syndrome as described in classic medical works corresponds on the whole to that of pulmonary tuberculosis." However, they also say that whether this demon disease really meant pulmonary tuberculosis or some other debilitating infectious disease is really not pertinent "because bone would be ineffective in the treatment of any infectious process."

Prescription 52.28.1 Tianlingaisan "Powder of human Skull Top", which is said to be "good for killing worms in a consumptive disease", mentions seeing a chuanshi. First, take "one piece of human skull top two fingers wide, simmer the drug with Tanxiang/sandalwood, then stir-fry with Su/butter. Then chant incantations." Fifteen herbal ingredients are added with the skull bone into a decoction, which will cause the patient to defecate "worms of strange shapes". Cooper & Sivin translate the chant that Luo omits, "This incantation is recited seven times in one breath: "Divine Father Thunder, Sage Mother Lightning, if you meet a cadaver vector you must control it. Quickly, quickly, as ordered by the law." This same prescription also mentions Daoistic ritual purification, "Before the drug is processed, one who prepares the drug should abstain from meat and wine and should stay in a clean, quiet room far away from the patient, so that he cannot smell it. When the drug is prepared, keep away chickens, dogs, cats and other animals, as well as sons in mourning and women. The room should be kept clear of all ugly and dirty things."

Prescription 52.28.2 is for treating guzheng "bone-steaming disease": "To treat consumptive disease with general debility and hectic fever due to Yin deficiency: Stir-fry a piece of human skull the size of a comb until it turns yellow. Then simmer it in five sheng of water until two sheng are left. Drink the decoction in three drafts. This is a drug that will cure the patient very effectively."

Two other cases of human-drug treatments for demonic medicine are sānshī 三尸 "Three Corpses; demonic spirits believed to live in the human body and hasten death" and gǔdú 蠱毒 gu poisoning; a poison produced by venomous insects; cast a black magic spirit possession over someone".

The first Bencao gangmu prescription for human nails is not from Chinese medical texts but from Daoist rituals for expelling what Cooper & Sivin describe as the "Three Corpse-Worms 三尸, the chief of the "inner gods" who are to the individual microcosm what the celestial bureaucracy is to the cosmos." Prescription 52.6.1, the 斬三尸法 "Method of Beheading the Three Corpses", involves supernaturally cutting the nails in accordance with the traditional 60-day sexagenary cycle in the Chinese calendar and Chinese astrology.

To kill Sanshi. The book Taishang Xuanke: Cut fingernails on Gengchen [17th] days and cut toenails on Jiawu [31st] days. Burn the nails into ash on the 16th day of the seventh month of the year. Take the ash by mouth with water. In this way all the Sanshi and the nine worms will turn into ash. It is also said that on the days of Jiayin [51st], Sanshi will invade the hands. Trim the fingernails on those days. Sanshi will invade the feet on the days of Jiawu [31st] so trim the toenails on those days.

Luo footnotes that Daoists believe sanshi to be "a kind of spirit haunting a patient. It may also be manifested as subcutaneous nodes appearing on three portions of the body cavity."

Gudu-poisoning diseases are supposedly treatable with four human drugs: dandruff, teeth, feces, and placenta. For instance (52.29.6) "To treat Gudu (disease caused by noxious agents produced by various parasites), no matter whether caused by a herb, a snake, or a dung beetle: It seems as if such things enter into the throat, causing terrible pain and making the patient feel as if he is dying. Wash a Ziheche/placenta hominis/dried human placenta and cut it into slices. Dry the slices in the sun and grind them into powder. Wash down one qianbi [an ancient coin] of the powder each time with boiled water."

== Modern medicine ==
Present day Chinese doctors and herbalists continue to prescribe human drugs, despite their lack of proven efficacy. Cooper & Sivin note that a modern TCM pharmacognosy handbook lists 634 medicinal substances, including 5 from humans: placenta, fingernails, ashed hair, urine, and urine sediment.

Four centuries after Li Shizhen considered the bioethical and biomedical dilemmas of using human drugs, 20th-century technological and medical advances have raised new related questions of organ transplants, transplantation medicine, organ trade, tissue banks, human cloning, and the commodification of human body parts.

== See also ==
- List of traditional Chinese medicines
- Medical cannibalism
- Traditional Chinese medicine

== Bibliography ==
- Cooper, William C.; Sivin, Nathan (1973). "Man as a Medicine. Pharmacological and Ritual Aspects of Drugs Derived from the Human Body". In Shigeru Nakayama; Nathan Sivin (eds.). Chinese Science: Explorations of an Ancient Tradition. MIT East Asian Science Series 2. MIT Press. pp. 203–272. ISBN 0-262-14011-X.
- Lu, Gwei-djen; Needham, Joseph (1964). "Medieval Preparations of Urinary Steroid Hormones". Medical History. 8 (2): 101–121. doi:10.1017/S0025727300029355. PMC 1033362. PMID 14139091.
- Li, Shizhen (2003). Compendium of Materia Medica. Bencao Gangmu (6 vols.). Translated by Luo, Xiwen. Foreign Languages Press. ISBN 978-7-119-03260-3.
- Unschuld, Paul Ulrich (1986). Medicine in China, A History of Pharmaceutics. University of California Press. ISBN 978-0-520-05025-9.
