= Human placentophagy =

Postpartum eating of human placenta

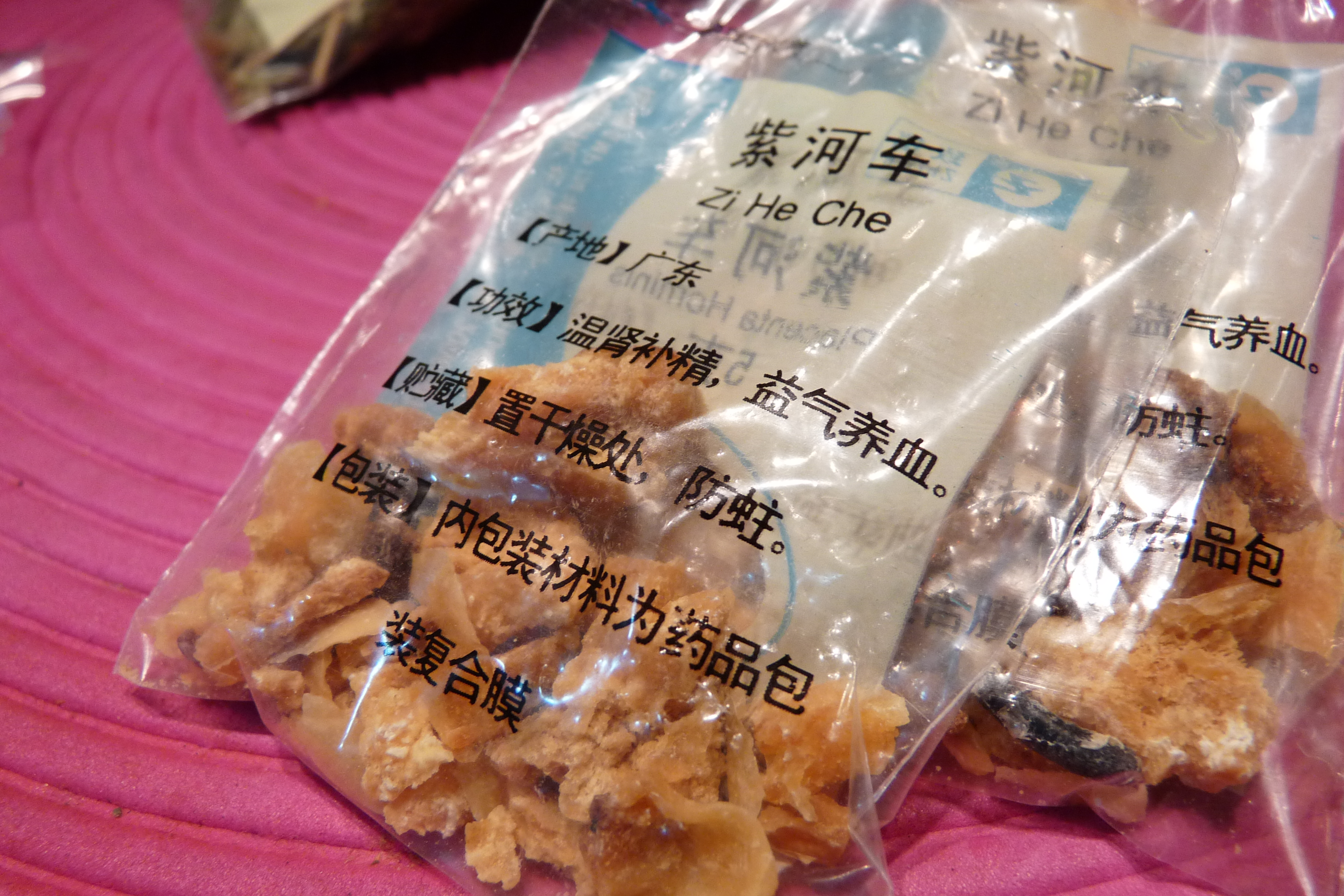
Dried human placenta as medicine - Ziheche (紫河车)

Human placentophagy, or consumption of the human placenta, is defined as "the ingestion of a human placenta postpartum, at any time, by any person, either in raw or altered (e.g., cooked, dried, steeped in liquid) form". It can be divided into two categories, maternal placentophagy and non-maternal placentophagy.

Although there are anecdotes of several cultures practicing placentophagy in varying contexts, maternal placentophagy started in the US in the 1970s, with little to no evidence of its practice in any traditional or historic culture. Midwives and alternative-health advocates in the U.S. are the primary groups encouraging post-partum maternal placentophagy. Maternal placentophagy has a small following in Western cultures, fostered by celebrities like January Jones. The human placenta is rich in protein, iron, and nutrients, but there is inconclusive scientific evidence of any health benefit to eating it. The risks of human placentophagy are also still unclear, but in one case a mother who consumed capsules of dehydrated placenta from her baby (which happened to be infected, because the baby was born infected) reinfected the baby with group B strep. (Initially the newborn was kept in the hospital for 11 days to treat a GBS infection. Meanwhile, 3 days after giving birth, the mother began ingesting the dried placenta capsules. 16 days after the birth, the baby needed a second 14-day hospitalization for a repeat GBS infection. The placenta capsules tested positive for GBS and were deemed the most likely cause for the repeat infection.)

== Maternal placentophagy ==
Maternal placentophagy is defined as "a mother's ingestion of her own placenta postpartum, in any form, at any time". Of the more than 4000 species of placental mammals, most, including herbivores, regularly engage in maternal placentophagy, thought to be an instinct to hide any trace of childbirth from predators in the wild. The exceptions to placentophagy include mainly humans, pinnipeds, sirenia, cetaceans, perissodactyls, and camelids.

== Non-maternal placentophagy ==
Non-maternal placentophagy is defined as "the ingestion of the placenta by any person other than the mother, at any time". Such instances of placentophagy have been attributed to the following: a shift toward carnivorousness at birth, specific hunger, and general hunger. With most Eutherian mammals, the placenta is consumed postpartum by the mother. Historically, humans more commonly consume the placenta of another woman under special circumstances.

== Historical occurrences ==
In a 1979 article in the Bulletin of the New York Academy of Medicine, William Ober evaluated the possibility that certain ancient cultures that practiced human sacrifice also practiced human placentophagy. However, a 2010 survey of 179 societies found that none practices placentophagy regularly. A 2007 study similarly found that placentophagy has never been described as a culturally normative practice in any historical source.

=== Decline of maternal placentophagy in humans ===
From an evolutionary perspective, it appears that the human species must have stopped practicing maternal placentophagy at a fairly early stage, since there is no evidence that it has ever been common. One hypothesis that has been offered is that the smoke of firewood caused environmental toxins to accumulate in the placenta, leading to harmful health outcomes for prehistoric mothers who stayed close to the community hearth and ate their placentas. However, there is no direct evidence for a taboo against placentophagy in human myth. The shift away from placentophagy may have occurred over one million years before present. It may have been the consequence of a more aquatic lifestyle, in agreement with the absence of placentophagy in aquatic mammals (cetacea, pinnipeds and sirenia).

=== Traditional medicine ===
Human placenta has been used traditionally in Chinese medicine, though the mother is not identified as the recipient of these treatments. A sixteenth-century Chinese medical text, the Compendium of Materia Medica, states in a section on medical uses of the placenta that, "when a woman in Liuqiu has a baby, the placenta is eaten", and that in Bagui, "the placenta of a boy is specially prepared and eaten by the mother's family and relatives." Another Chinese medical text, the Great Pharmacopoeia of 1596, recommends placental tissue mixed with human milk to help overcome the effects of qi exhaustion. Dried, powdered placenta would be stirred into three wine-cups of milk to make a Connected Destiny Elixir. The elixir would be warmed in sunlight, then taken as treatment. It is not known exactly how traditional this remedy was, nor exactly how far back it dates.

In Jamaica, bits of placental membranes were put into an infant's tea to prevent convulsions caused by ghosts. In ancient Egypt, as well, pieces of placenta were soaked in milk and fed to the infant to test for infant mortality.

The Chaga of Tanganyika place the placenta in a receptacle for two months to dry. Once dry, it is ground into flour from which a porridge is made. The porridge is served to old women of the family as a way of preserving the child's life.

In Central India, women of the Kol Tribe eat placenta to aid reproductive function. It is believed that consumption of placenta by a childless woman "may dispel the influences that keep her barren".

The Kurtachi of the Solomon Islands mixed placenta into the mother's supply of powdered lime for chewing with the areca nut.

In the Maremma region of Italy, it was common at one time to mix pieces of placenta into the food of a new mother without her knowledge; this was intended to promote a healthy flow of milk.

=== Cultural and spiritual beliefs ===
Beliefs behind the practices of consuming the placenta, whether in part or in whole, commonly reflect acknowledgment for the vast work of this organ for the baby in utero, serving as its 'protector' and providing critical vital functions for the baby before birth. The placenta can be seen as the Tree of Life, as a genetic 'twin' to the fetus, an angel, and reasons for ingesting the placenta may reflect spiritual beliefs as much as the pragmatic ones listed above. Traditional practices to revere and honor the placenta that do not include consumption may include placenta burial, such as in Saudi Arabia. Such traditions reflect human birthing practices wherein umbilical cords may not have been severed while the cord is still pulsing, avoiding blood loss and infection, and may include practices that retain the placental connection until after it has been delivered and the baby is already nursing.

== Modern placentophagy ==
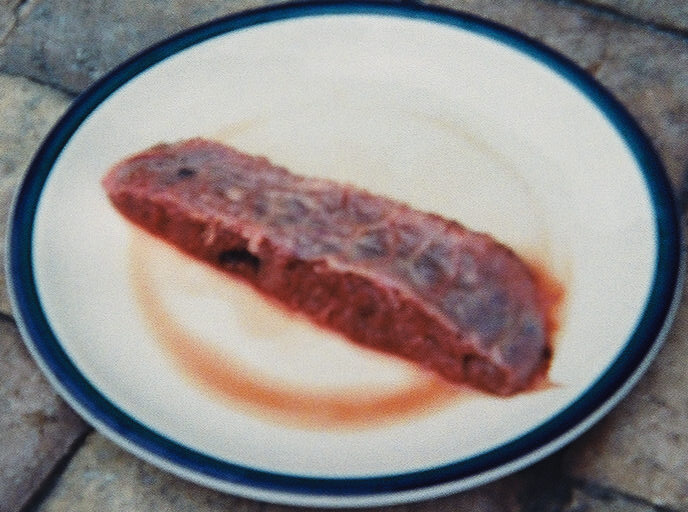
A slice of placenta, being prepared for consumption.

Modern practice of placentophagy is rare, as most contemporary human cultures do not promote its consumption. Placentophagy did receive popular culture attention in 2012, however, when American actress January Jones credited eating her placenta as helping her get back to work on the set of Mad Men after just six weeks.

Instances of placentophagy have been recorded among certain modern cultures. In the 1960s "male and female Vietnamese nurses and midwives of Chinese and Thai background consum[ed] the placentas of their young, healthy patients" for reasons unspecified, as reported by a Czechoslovak medical officer in at the Hospital of Czechoslovak-Vietnamese Friendship in Haiphong. Placentas were stripped of their membranous parts and fried with onions before being eaten.

A more recent cross-cultural ethnographic study by researchers at the University of Nevada, Las Vegas surveyed 179 contemporary human societies, and identified only one culture (Chicano, or Mexican-American) that mentioned the practice of maternal placentophagy. This account, centering on Chicano and Anglo midwifery in San Antonio, Texas, stated, "cooking and eating part of the placenta has ... been reported by a couple of midwives. One Anglo mother ... was reported to have roasted the placenta." This instance, however, may not be indicative of any larger cultural trends, as no other records of placentophagy were found in the Chicano culture. This same study also recorded three references of non-maternal placentophagy:

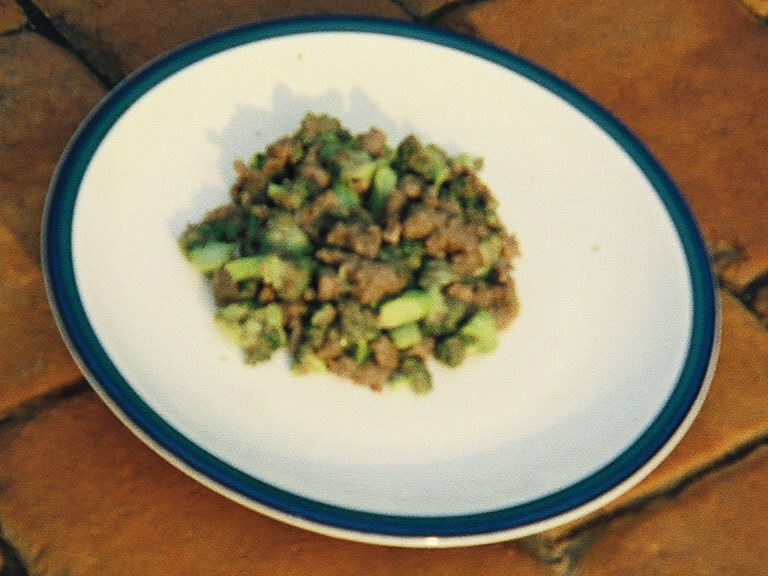
Placenta prepared in a stir-fry with broccoli

- Traditional Gullah medicine dictates that when a baby is born with a caul, with amniotic membranes over the face at birth, the placenta is made into a tea and then consumed by the child to "prevent them from seeing spirits that would otherwise haunt [them]".
- Practice of paternal placentophagy was identified in the Malekula of Melanesia. "In Espiritu Santo, the new father [eats] a pudding made from the cooked placenta and blood."
- Oral administration of the placenta was reported in Sino-Vietnamese medicine to aid the recovery of those suffering from tuberculosis.

In a follow-up study, the UNLV researchers were joined by colleagues at the University of South Florida, and surveyed women who had engaged in maternal placentophagy previously. Of the 189 placentophagic women surveyed, the researchers found that 95 percent of participants had "positive" or "very positive" subjective experiences from eating their own placenta, citing beliefs of "improved mood", "increased energy", and "improved lactation". The authors themselves, however, state that "exceedingly little research has been conducted to assess these claims and no systematic analysis has been performed to evaluate the experiences of women who engage in this behavior." In the United States as many as 30% of women who planned community births may consume the placenta, often citing avoidance of postpartum depression as the reason.

== Current beliefs among placentophagists ==
During pregnancy, women often become iron deficient because iron is transported across the placenta to the fetus. Because low levels of iron are known to negatively affect mood, researchers are exploring the possible link between iron status and postpartum depression. Placentophagy advocates claim that the placenta provides an excellent source of dietary iron, and may therefore improve maternal postpartum iron status. However, a recent randomized, double-blind, placebo-controlled pilot study conducted by researchers at UNLV found that consuming a commonly recommended daily intake of encapsulated placenta (approximately 3,000 mg per day) only provides about one-quarter of the RDA for iron for lactating women. The study found no differences in maternal iron status over a three-week postpartum period between women consuming 3300 mg/day of cooked, encapsulated placenta, and study participants taking a beef "placebo".

== Preparation ==
In many areas placenta encapsulation specialists can be found to professionally prepare the placenta for consumption. Also, many online alternative health sources give instructions for preparing it personally. One common method of preparation is encapsulation. The encapsulation process can be one of two ways: steamed or raw. With the steamed encapsulation process, the placenta is gently steamed with various herbs (ginger, lemon, frankincense, myrrh, etc.), fully dehydrated, ground into a fine powder, and then put into capsules. The raw method does not involve steaming first. The placenta will be fully dehydrated, ground, and then put into capsules.

== Controversy ==
Many researchers remain skeptical of whether the practice of placentophagy is of value to humans. A 2015 review found that while a minority of women in western countries perceive placentophagy as reducing the risk of postpartum depression and enhancing recovery, there is no evidence that this is the case. The same study also found inconclusive evidence that placentophagy was of any benefit to facilitating uterine contraction, resumption of normal cyclic estrogen cycle, and milk production. As well, the authors stated that the risks of placentophagy also warrant more investigation.

A researcher who had previously researched why animals eat their placentas stated in 2007 that "people can believe what they want, but there's no research to substantiate claims of human benefit. The cooking process will destroy all the protein and hormones. Drying it out or freezing it would destroy other things." UNLV researchers found that some essential minerals and steroid hormones remained in human placenta that was cooked and processed for encapsulation and consumption.

Although human placentophagy entails the consumption of human tissue by a human or humans, its status as cannibalism is debated.

== See also ==
- Fetal cannibalism
- Medical cannibalism
- Placentophagy (all species)
