= Mellification =

Mellification can refer to:

- The making or production of honey
- The process of producing human mummy confection

== See also ==
- Melliferous
