= Mellified man =

Legendary medicinal substance, made of a human corpse preserved in honey

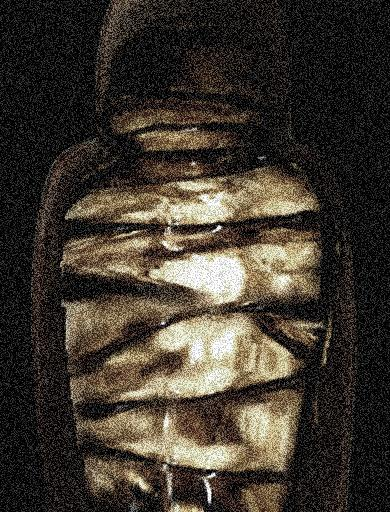
Mellified man (artistic impression)

A mellified man, also known as a human mummy confection, was a legendary medicinal substance created by steeping a human cadaver in honey. The concoction is detailed in Chinese medical sources, including the Bencao Gangmu of the 16th century. Relying on a second-hand account, the text reports a story that some elderly men in Arabia, nearing the end of their lives, would submit themselves to a process of mummification in honey to create a healing confection.

This process differed from a simple body donation because of the aspect of self-sacrifice; the mellification process would ideally start before death. The donor would stop eating any food other than honey, going as far as to bathe in the substance. Shortly, the donor's feces and even sweat would consist of honey. When this diet finally proved fatal, the donor's body would be placed in a stone coffin filled with honey.

After a century or so, the contents would have turned into a sort of confection reputedly capable of healing broken limbs and other ailments. This confection would then be sold in street markets as a hard to find item with a hefty price.

== Etymology ==
Bencao Gangmu calls the concoction mìrén (蜜人), translated as "honey person" or "mellified man". Mìzìrén (蜜漬人, "honey-saturated person") is a modern synonym. The place it comes from is Tiānfāngguó (天方國), an archaic name for Arabia or the Middle East. The Chinese mùnǎiyī (木乃伊), along with "mummy" loanwords in many other languages, derives from Arabic mūmiyāʾ (مومياء, "mummy") or from Persian mumiyâ (مومیا, "mummy"), itself from mūm "wax".

Mellification is a mostly obsolete term for the production of honey, or the process of honeying something, from the Latin mellificāre ("to make honey"), or mel ("honey"). The Ancient Greek word mélissa (μέλισσα) means "bee; honeybee; (poetic) honey".

== Origins ==
Some of the earliest known records of mellified corpses come from Greek historian Herodotus (5th century BCE) who recorded that the Assyrians used to embalm their dead with honey. A century later, Alexander the Great's body was reportedly preserved in a honey-filled sarcophagus, and there are also indications that this practice was known to the Egyptians.

Another record of mellification is found in the Bencao Gangmu (section 52, "Man as medicine") under the entry for mùnǎiyī (木乃伊, "mummy"). It quotes the Yuan and Ming-era scholar Tao Zongyi's c. 1366 Nancun Chuogeng Lu as saying that

In the lands of the Arabs there are men 70 or 80 years old who are willing to give their bodies to save others. Such a one takes no more food or drink, only bathing and eating a little honey, till after a month his excreta are nothing but honey; then death ensues. His compatriots place the body to macerate in a stone coffin full of honey, with an inscription giving the year and month of burial. After a hundred years, the seals are removed and the confection so formed used for the treatment of wounds and fractures of the body and limbs—only a small amount taken internally is needed for the cure. Although it is scarce in those parts, the common people call it "mellified man" [mìrén, 蜜人], or, in their foreign speech, "mu-nai-i".

The entry comments: "Thus Mr. Thao, but I myself do not know whether the tale is true or not. In any case, I append it for the consideration of the learned."

According to Joseph Needham and Lu Gwei-djen, this content was Arabic, but Li Shizhen confused the story with a Burmese custom of preserving the bodies of abbots and high monks in honey, so that "the Western notion of a drug made from perdurable human flesh was combined with the characteristic Buddhist motif of self-sacrifice for others". Writer Mary Roach observes that the text does not vouch for the veracity of the mellified man story.

== In popular culture ==
- The novel The Dervish House by Ian McDonald features a hunt for a mellified man.
- A segment of the eighth episode of the fourth series of the British children's historical sketch show Horrible Histories features this concept.
- The song "Sweet Bod" by Neil Cicierega (also known as Lemon Demon) on the 2016 album Spirit Phone is about this concept, containing many lyrics revolving around a corpse being mummified in honey, and the sale of said honey for medicinal purposes.

== See also ==
- Medical cannibalism
- Mummia
