= Mummia =

Historical type of medicine

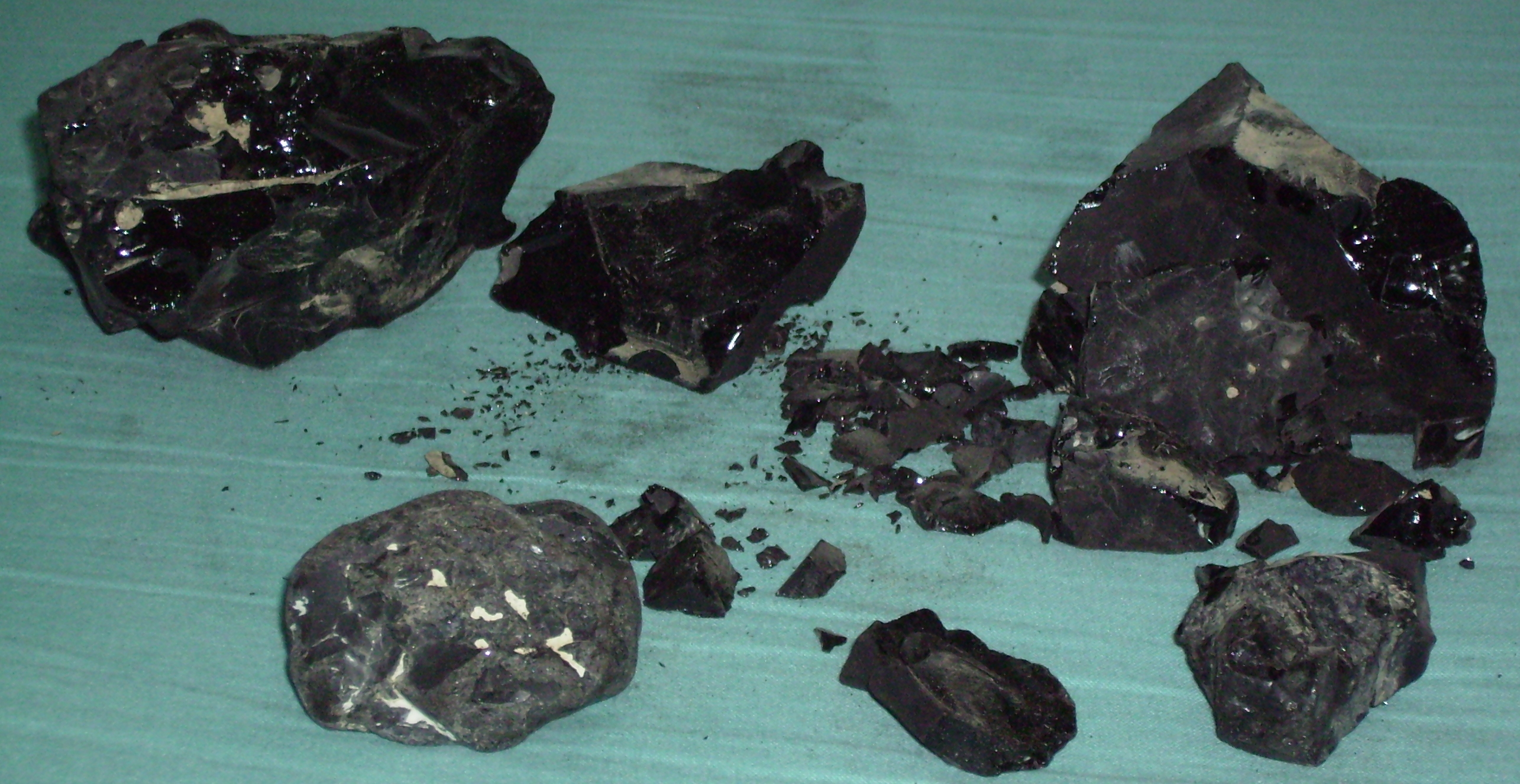
Natural asphalt/bitumen from the Dead Sea

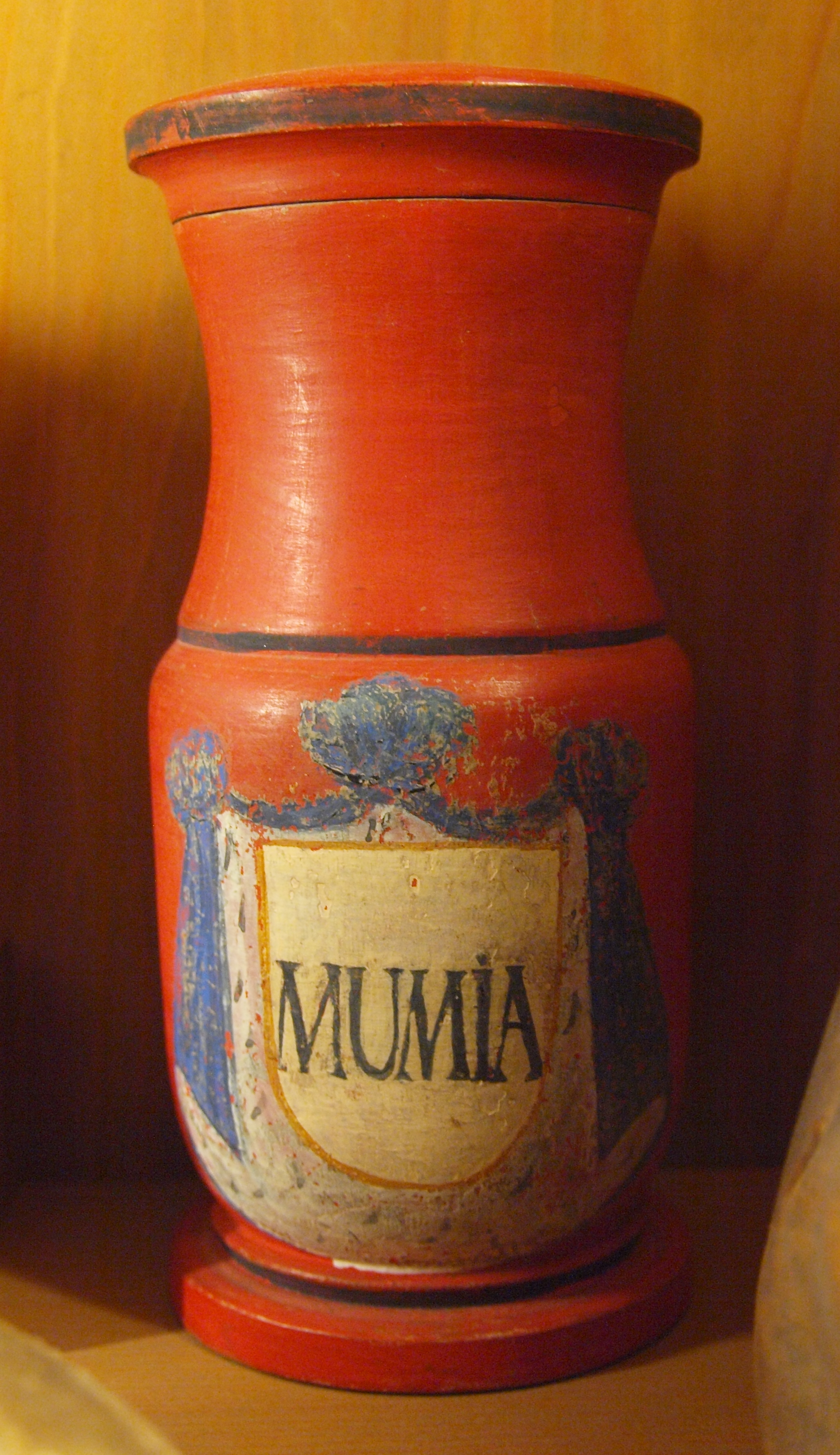
Apothecary vessel of the 18th century with inscription MUMIA

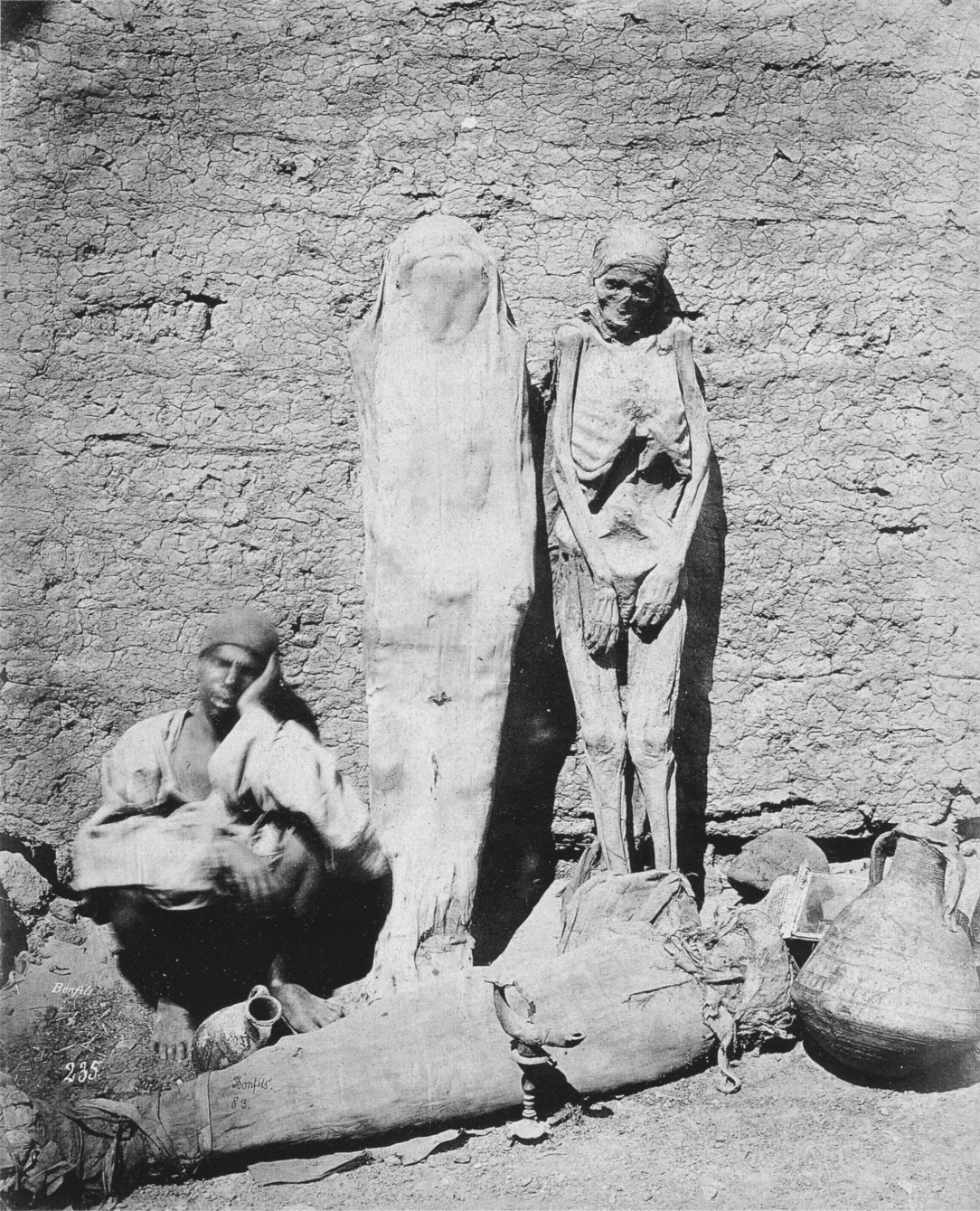
Egyptian mummy seller (1875, Félix Bonfils)

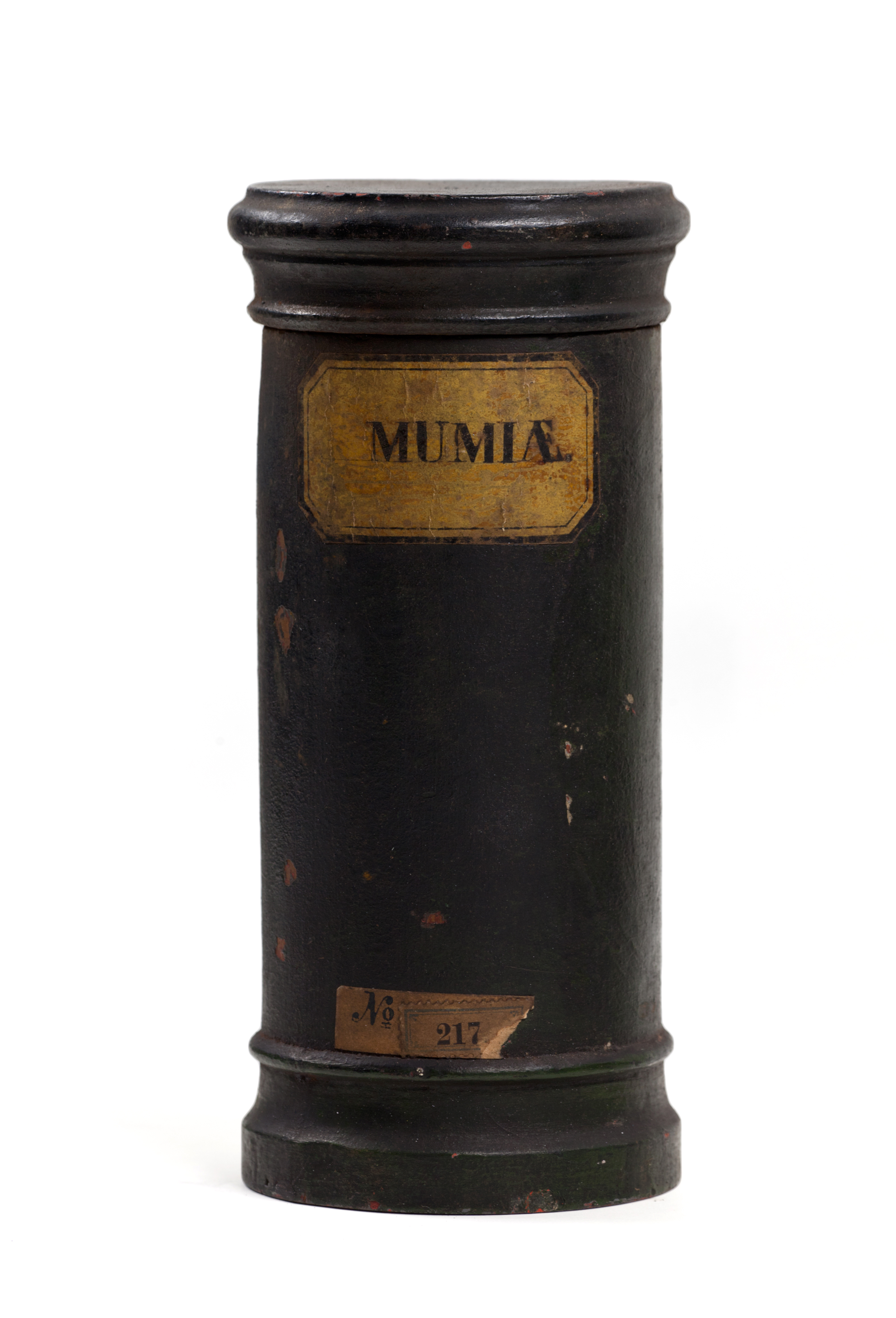
Wooden apothecary vessel with inscription "MUMIÆ", Hamburg Museum

Mummia, mumia, or originally mummy was any of several different preparations in the history of medicine, from "mineral pitch" to "powdered human mummies". It originated from Arabic mūmiyā "a type of resinous bitumen found in Western Asia and used curatively" in traditional Islamic medicine, which was translated as pissasphaltus (from "pitch" and "asphalt") in ancient Greek medicine. In medieval European medicine, mūmiyā "bitumen" was transliterated into Latin as mumia meaning both "a bituminous medicine from Persia" and "mummy". Merchants in apothecaries dispensed expensive mummia bitumen, which was thought to be an effective cure-all for many ailments. It was also used as an aphrodisiac.

Beginning around the 12th century when supplies of imported natural bitumen ran short, mummia was misinterpreted as "mummy", and the word's meaning expanded to "a black resinous exudate scraped out from embalmed Egyptian mummies". This began a period of lucrative trade between Egypt and Europe, and suppliers substituted rare mummia exudate with entire mummies, either embalmed or desiccated. After Egypt banned the shipment of mummia in the 16th century, unscrupulous European apothecaries began to sell fraudulent mummia prepared by embalming and desiccating fresh corpses.

By the 18th century, doubts about mummia's medical value had grown and its use became rarer, though it was still occasionally sold into the early 20th century. Artists in the 17–19th centuries also used ground-up mummies to tint a popular oil paint called mummy brown.

== Terminology ==
The etymologies of both English mummia and mummy derive from Medieval Latin mumia, which transcribes Arabic mūmiyā "a kind of bitumen used medicinally; a bitumen-embalmed body" from mūm "wax (used in embalming)", which descend from Persian mumiya and mum.

The Oxford English Dictionary records the complex semantic history of mummy and mummia. Mummy was first recorded meaning "a medicinal preparation of the substance of mummies; hence, an unctuous liquid or gum used medicinally" (c. 1400), which Shakespeare used jocularly for "dead flesh; body in which life is extinct" (1598), and later "a pulpy substance or mass" (1601). Second, it was semantically extended to mean "a sovereign remedy" (1598), "a medicinal bituminous drug obtained from Arabia and the East" (1601), "a kind of wax used in the transplanting and grafting of trees" (1721), and "a rich brown bituminous pigment" (1854). The third mummy meaning was "the body of a human being or animal embalmed (according to the ancient Egyptian or some analogous method) as a preparation for burial" (1615), and "a human or animal body desiccated by exposure to sun or air" (1727). Mummia was originally used in mummy's first meaning "a medicinal preparation…" (1486), then in the second meaning "a sovereign remedy" (1741), and lastly to specify "in mineralogy, a sort of bitumen, or mineral pitch, which is soft and tough, like shoemaker's wax, when the weather is warm, but brittle, like pitch, in cold weather. It is found in Persia, where it is highly valued" (1841). In modern English usage, mummy commonly means "embalmed body" as distinguished from mummia "a medicine" in historical contexts.

Mummia or mumia is defined by three English mineralogical terms. Bitumen (from Latin bitūmen) originally meant "a kind of mineral pitch found in Palestine and Babylon, used as mortar, etc. The same as asphalt, mineral pitch, Jew's pitch, Bitumen judaicum", and in modern scientific use means "the generic name of certain mineral inflammable substances, native hydrocarbons more or less oxygenated, liquid, semi-solid, and solid, including naphtha, petroleum, asphalt, etc." Asphalt (from Ancient Greek ásphaltos "asphalt, bitumen”) first meant "A bituminous substance, found in many parts of the world, a smooth, hard, brittle, black or brownish-black resinous mineral, consisting of a mixture of different hydrocarbons; called also mineral pitch, Jews' pitch, and in the [Old Testament] 'slime'", and presently means "A composition made by mixing bitumen, pitch, and sand, or manufactured from natural bituminous limestones, used to pave streets and walks, to line cisterns, etc.", used as an abbreviation for asphalt concrete. Until the 20th century, the Latinate term asphaltum was also used. Pissasphalt (from Greek pissasphaltus "pitch" and "asphalt") names "A semi-liquid variety of bitumen, mentioned by ancient writers".

The medicinal use of bituminous mummia has a parallel in Ayurveda: shilajit or silajit (from Sanskrit shilajatu "rock-conqueror") or mumijo (from Persian mūmiyā "wax") is "A name given to various solid or viscous substances found on rock in India and Nepal ... esp. a usu. dark-brown odoriferous substance which is used in traditional Indian medicine and probably consists principally of dried animal urine".

== History ==
The usage of mumiya as medicine began with the famous Persian mumiya black pissasphalt remedy for wounds and fractures, which was confused with similarly appearing black bituminous materials used in Egyptian mummification. This was misinterpreted by Medieval Latin translators to mean whole mummies. Starting in the 12th century and continuing until as far as the 19th century, mummies and bitumen from mummies would be common in European medicine and art, as well as Egyptian trade.

Bitumen or asphalt had many uses in the ancient world such as glue, mortar, and waterproofing. The ancient Egyptians began to use bitumen for embalming mummies during the Twelfth Dynasty (1991–1802 BCE).

According to historians of pharmacy, mummia became part of the materia medica of the Arabs, discussed by Muhammad ibn Zakariya al-Razi (845–925) and Ibn al-Baitar (1197–1248). Medieval Persian physicians used bitumen/asphalt both as a salve for cuts, bruises, and bone fractures, and as an internal medicine for stomach ulcers and tuberculosis. They achieved the best results with a black pissasphalt that seeped from a mountain in Darabgerd, Persia. The Greek physician Pedanius Dioscorides' c. 50–70 De Materia Medica ranked bitumen from the Dead Sea as medicinally superior to the pissasphalt from Apollonia (Illyria), both of which were considered to be an equivalent substitute for the scarce and expensive Persian mumiya.

During the Crusades, European soldiers learned firsthand of the drug mummia, which was considered to have great healing powers in cases of fracture and rupture. The demand for mummia increased in Europe and since the supply of natural bitumen from Persia and the Dead Sea was limited, the search for a new source turned to the tombs of Egypt.

Misinterpreting the Latin word mumia "medicinal bitumen" involved several steps. The first was to substitute substances exuded by Egyptian mummies for the natural product. The Arab physician Serapion the Younger (fl. 12th century) wrote about bituminous mumia and its many uses, but the Latin translation of Simon Geneunsis (d. 1303) said, "Mumia, this is the mumia of the sepulchers with aloes and myrrh mixed with the liquid (humiditate) of the human body". Two 12th-century Italian examples: Gerard of Cremona, mistakenly translated Arabic mumiya as "the substance found in the land where bodies are buried with aloes by which the liquid of the dead, mixed with the aloes, is transformed and it is similar to marine pitch", and the physician Matthaeus Platearius said "Mumia is a spice found in the sepulchers of the dead. ... That is best which is black, ill-smelling, shiny, and massive".

The second step was to confuse and replace the rare black exudation from embalmed corpses with the black bitumen that Egyptians used as an embalming preservative. The Baghdad physician Abd al-Latif al-Baghdadi (1162–1231) described ancient Egyptian mummies, "In the belly and skull of these corpses is also found in great abundance called mummy", added that although the word properly denoted bitumen or asphalt, "The mummy found in the hollows of the corpses in Egypt, differs but immaterially from the nature of mineral mummy; and where any difficulty arises in procuring the latter, may be substituted in its stead."

The third step in misinterpreting mummia was to substitute the blackened flesh of an entire mummy for the hardened bituminous materials from the interior cavities of the cadavers. The ancient tombs of Egypt and the deserts could not meet the European demand for the drug mumia, so a commerce developed in the manufacture and sale of fraudulent mummies, sometimes called mumia falsa. The Italian surgeon Giovanni da Vigo (1450–1525) defined mumia as "The flesh of a dead body that is embalmed, and it is hot and dry in the second [grade], and therefore it has virtue to incarne [i.e., heal over] wounds and to staunch blood", and included it in his list of essential drugs.

The Swiss-German polymath Paracelsus (1493–1541) gave mummia a new meaning of "intrinsic spirit" and said true pharmaceutical mummia must be "the body of a man who did not die a natural death but rather died an unnatural death with a healthy body and without sickness". The German physician Oswald Croll (1563–1609) said mumia was "not the liquid matter which is found in the Egyptian sepulchers", but rather "the flesh of a man that perishes a violent death, and kept for some time in the air", and gave a detailed recipe for making tincture of mumia from the corpse of a young red-haired man, who had been hanged, bludgeoned on the breaking wheel, exposed to the air for days, then cut into small pieces, sprinkled with powdered myrrh and aloes, soaked in wine, and dried.

Renaissance scholars and physicians first expressed opposition to using human mumia in the 16th century. The French naturalist Pierre Belon (1517–1564) concluded that the Arab physicians, from whom the western writers derived their knowledge of mumia, had actually referred to the pissasphalt of Dioscorides, which had been misconstrued by the translators. He said Europeans were importing both the "falsely called" mumia obtained from scraping the bodies of cadavers, and "artificial mumia" made by exposing buried dead bodies to the heat of the sun before grinding them up. While he considered the available mumia to be a valueless and even dangerous drug, he noted that King Francis I always carried with him a mixture of mumia and rhubarb to use as an immediate remedy for any injury. The barber surgeon Ambroise Paré (d. 1590) revealed the manufacture of fake mummia both in France, where apothecaries would steal the bodies of executed criminals, dry them in an oven, and sell the flesh; and in Egypt, where a merchant, who admitted to collecting dead bodies and preparing mummia, expressed surprise that the Christians, "so dainty-mouthed, could eat the bodies of the dead". Paré admitted to having personally administered mumia a hundred times, but condemned "this wicked kinde of Drugge, doth nothing helpe the diseased", and so he stopped prescribing it and encouraged others not to use mumia. The English herbalist John Gerard's 1597 Herball described the ancient Egyptians using cedar pitch for embalming, and noted that the preserved bodies that shopkeepers falsely call "mumia" should be what the Greeks called pissasphalton. Gerard blamed the error on the translator of Serapion who interpreted mumia "according to his own fancie" that it is the exudate from an embalmed human corpse.

The medical use of Egyptian mumia continued through the 17th century. The physicist Robert Boyle (1627–1691) praised it as "one of the useful medicines commended and given by our physicians for falls and bruises, and in other cases too." The Dutch physician Steven Blankaart's 1754 Lexicon medicum renovatum listed four types of mumia: Arabian exudate from bodies embalmed with spices and asphalt, Egyptian bodies embalmed with pissasphalt, sun-dried bodies found in the desert, the natural pissasphalt. Mummia's familiarity as a remedy in Britain is demonstrated by passing references in Shakespeare, Francis Beaumont and John Fletcher, and John Donne, and also by more detailed remarks in the writings of Thomas Browne, Francis Bacon, and Robert Boyle.

By the 18th century, skepticism about the pharmaceutical value of mumia was increasing, and medical opinion was turning against its use. The English medical writer John Quincy wrote in 1718 that although mumia was still listed in medicinal catalogues, "it is quite out of use in Prescription". Mummia was offered for sale medicinally as late as 1924 in the price list of the German chemical-pharmaceutical company Merck Group, at 12 gold marks per kilogram.

Both mummia and asphalt have long been used as pigments. The British chemist and painter Arthur Herbert Church described the use of mummia for making "mummy brown" oil paint:

'Mummy', as a pigment, is inferior to prepared, but superior to raw, asphalt, inasmuch as it has been submitted to a considerable degree of heat, and has thereby lost some of its volatile hydrocarbons. Moreover, it is usual to grind up the bones and other parts of the mummy together, so that the resulting powder has more solidity and is less fusible than the asphalt alone would be. A London colourman informs me that one Egyptian mummy furnishes sufficient material to satisfy the demands of his customers for twenty years. It is perhaps scarcely necessary to add that some samples of the pigment sold as 'mummy' are spurious.

The modern pigment sold as "mummy brown" is composed of a mixture of kaolin, quartz, goethite and hematite.

== See also ==
- Bitumen of Judea
- Human fat
- Medical cannibalism
- Mellified man

== Additional sources ==
- Elliott, Chris (2017). "Bandages, Bitumen, Bodies and Business – Egyptian mummies as raw materials". Aegyptiaca: Journal of the History of Reception of Ancient Egypt. 1: 26–46.
