= Medical cannibalism =

Consumption of parts of the human body to treat or prevent diseases

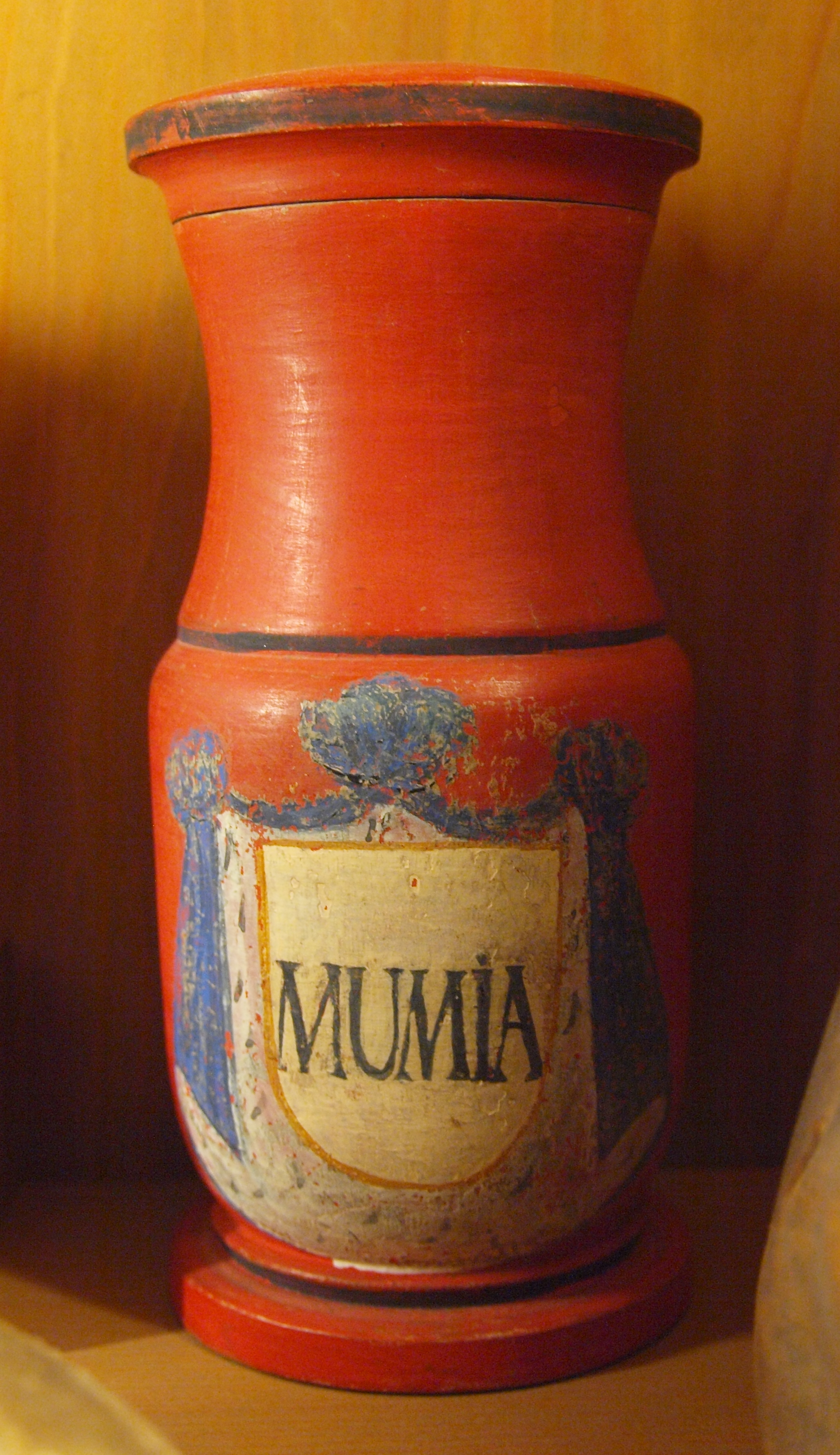
An 18th-century albarello used for storing mummia

Medical or medicinal cannibalism is the consumption of parts of the human body, dead or alive, to treat or prevent diseases. The medical trade and pharmacological use of human body parts and fluids often arose from the belief that because the human body is able to heal itself, it can also help heal another human body. Much of medical cannibalism applied the principles of sympathetic magic, for example that powdered blood helps bleeding, human fat helps bruising, and powdered skulls help with migraines or dizziness. Medical cannibalism has been documented especially for Europe and China.

In Europe, thousands of Egyptian mummies were ground up and sold as medicine, since powdered human mummy – called mummia – was thought to stop internal bleeding and to have other healing properties. Reaching its peak in the 16th century, the practice continued, in a few cases, until the early 20th century. Fresh human blood, particularly from recently executed criminals, was also highly valued because of its supposed healing powers, a custom that goes back to Ancient Rome, where the blood of wounded gladiators was thought to cure epilepsy.

In China, the consumption of human flesh as a medical treatment dates back to at least the Tang dynasty, when it was endorsed by medical texts like the Bencao Shiyi. In hundreds of documented cases, young individuals, often women, voluntarily cut flesh from their bodies to feed to their ill parents or parents-in-law. Later medical manuals like the Bencao Gangmu advised against the use of human body parts, though still acknowledging their use in treating diseases. During the Cultural Revolution, cannibalism resurged in the context of political and social upheaval, with instances of individuals consuming the organs of perceived "class enemies" under the belief they had healing properties. In the mid-1990s, journalists uncovered an underground market in aborted fetuses in China and Hong Kong, and more than 17,000 pills supposedly filled with the powdered flesh of fetuses or stillborns were seized by South Korean customs officials in 2011/2012.

== History ==
=== Europe ===
If one includes the drinking of human blood in one's understanding of "cannibalism" (which the Ancient Romans themselves would not have done), then medical cannibalism in Europe can be traced back to Ancient Rome, where the blood of wounded gladiators was sometimes drunk out of a belief that it could cure epilepsy.

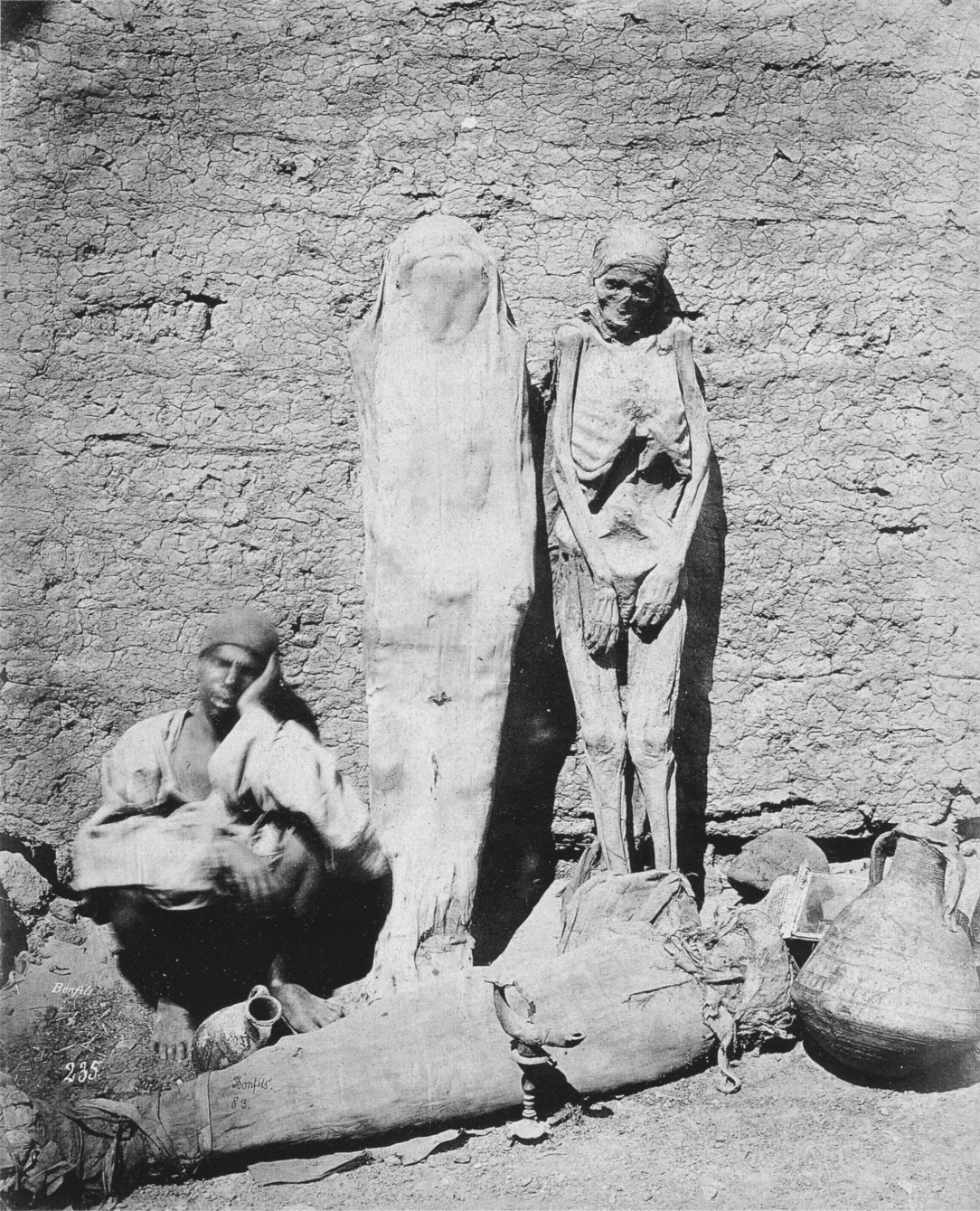
Egyptian mummy seller in 1875

Medical cannibalism in Europe reached its peak in the 16th century, with the practice becoming widespread in Germany, France, Italy, and England. At that time, most "raw materials" for the practice came from mummies stolen from Egyptian tombs; additionally skulls were taken from Irish burial sites and gravediggers sometimes robbed and sold body parts. The four most common direct sources of human body parts came from the gallows, battlefields, anatomists, and graves.

Medicines were created from human bones, blood, and fat and believed to treat many types of illnesses. Tinctures to treat internal bleeding were made by soaking mummified bodies in alcohol or vinegar. Powdered skull was used to treat ailments of the head, and was sometimes mixed with chocolate to treat apoplexy. In the early 19th century, Englishmen still treated epilepsy by mixing skull with molasses.

As such practices became more common, the principle that "like cures like" was used to determine the treatment for various ailments. For example, parts of the head were used to treat issues relating to the head, and eyes of dead people were collected and used to treat ophthalmological issues.

Blood, specifically, soon evolved to be seen as a substantial elixir — especially fresh, warm human blood because it was believed to still possess the soul of the deceased. For example, it was believed that drinking the blood of a strong person or a wise person would result in an increase of strength or wisdom, respectively, because once ingested, the spirit of the deceased connected with that of the consumer and lend them its power. This belief was especially common in Germany. Even the poor, who could not afford other remedies, took part in this practice by bringing a cup to executions, paying the executioner a small fee, then filling their cup with the fresh blood. The execution of criminals was seen as having a double advantage: alive they were "a burden on the nation", but their dead bodies had "the power to serve a public good" by improving the health of others.

Europeans also adopted a belief they considered to be of Ancient Egyptian origin, namely that the more valuable corpses were those of young individuals, especially those that had died a brutal sudden death, for it was believed that the spirit would remain trapped within the body for a longer period of time, and thus have greater healing powers.

=== China ===
In China, the consumption of human flesh was considered a highly effective medical treatment at least since the Tang dynasty (618–907). It was recommended by the Bencao Shiyi, an influential medical reference book published in the early 8th century, as well as in similar later manuals. Together with the ethical ideal of filial piety, according to which young people were supposed to do everything in their power to support their parents and parents-in-law, this idea lead to a unique form of voluntary cannibalism, in which a young person cut some of the flesh out of their body and gave it to an ill parent or parent-in-law for consumption. The majority of the donors were women, frequently daughters-in-law of the patient.

The devoted daughter-in-law would tie her thigh or her arm very tightly with a piece of clothing. She would then use a very sharp knife to quickly slice off a piece from her upper arm or upper thigh. The flesh would immediately be mixed in with soup or gruel, which had been heated in preparation, and this would then be offered to the dying mother-in-law or father-in-law.

The Official Dynastic Histories describe more than 110 cases of such voluntary offerings that took place between the early 7th and the early 20th centuries. There were still occasional cases in the 1970s and 1980s, according to newspaper reports. The body parts cut most often were (in this order) thighs, upper arms, and livers. While most of the donors were young adults or possibly teenagers, some were girls or less commonly boys aged from 7 to 12.

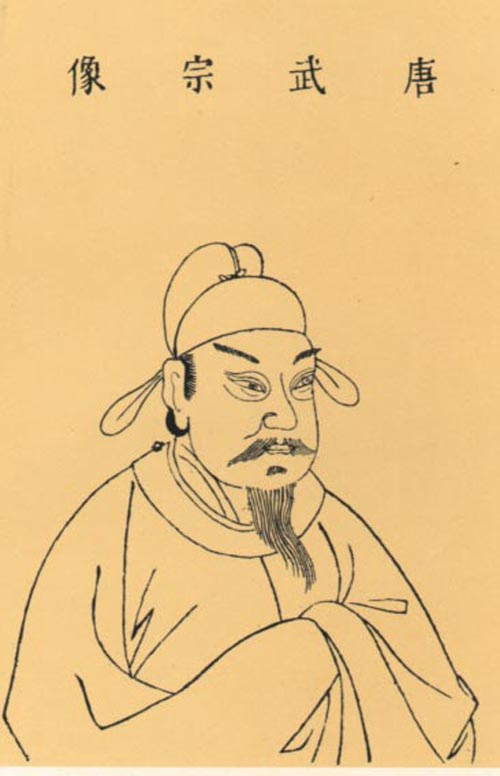
Emperor Wuzong of Tang supposedly ate human flesh to cure his illness

While these acts were (at least nominally) voluntary and the donors usually (though not always) survived them, several sources also report of children and adolescents who were killed so that their flesh could be eaten for medical purposes. According to some sources, eating the boiled heart of a child was considered a good way of extending one's own life (especially if regularly repeated) – though inevitably deadly for the "donor". Emperor Wuzong of Tang supposedly ordered provincial officials to send him "the hearts and livers of fifteen-year-old boys and girls" when he had become seriously ill, hoping in vain this medicine would cure him. Later private individuals sometimes followed his example, paying soldiers who kidnapped preteen children for their kitchen.

In later times, medical manuals took a more ambivalent stance towards the use of human flesh. The influential Bencao Gangmu, first published in the late 16th century, advises in its introduction against the use of human body parts for medicine. But in its main part it nevertheless covers "35 different parts or organs of the human body ... considered to be a good cure for certain diseases", among them human flesh (whose consumption was said to cure tuberculosis) and blood.

During the Cultural Revolution (1966–1976), hundreds of incidents of cannibalism occurred, mostly motivated by hatred against supposed "class enemies". However, health concerns sometimes played a role as well, as the writer Zheng Yi observed. In a case recorded by the local authorities, a school teacher in Mengshan County "heard that consuming a 'beauty's heart' could cure disease". He then chose a 13- or 14-year-old student of his and publicly denounced her as a member of the enemy faction, which was enough to get her killed by an angry mob. After the others had left, he "cut open the girl's chest ..., dug out her heart, and took it home to enjoy".

Another teacher, from Cangwu County, had been present when the vice principal of his school was killed and consumed on the school premises, by pupils and teachers alike. He admitted having joined in the feast after one of his students "held up a piece of dried human flesh the size of a finger and said to me: 'You have chronic stomach problems. This is good for you!' Thus, I also ate the flesh." In a further case that took place in Wuxuan County, likewise in the Guangxi region, three brothers were beaten to death as supposed enemies; afterwards their livers were cut out, baked, and consumed "as medicine".

== Recent cases ==
=== Fetus eating in China ===
In the mid-1990s, Hong Kong journalists exposed "an underground market in human foetuses" in both Mainland China and Hong Kong. Traders connected to hospitals sold aborted fetuses for consumption, charging "up to $300 apiece" and promising "all sorts of medical benefits ... from rejuvenation to a cure for asthma". While recovering from an accident, the director Fruit Chan was repeatedly served an "'exceptional' soup" by his doctor, finding out only later that it was "made of fetus". Chan and the screenwriter Lilian Lee believe that they also unknowingly ate such soup while researching in hospitals for their movie Dumplings (2004), which features this custom.

In 2011/2012, more than 17,000 capsule pills purported to be filled with the powdered flesh of human fetuses or stillborns and "touted for increasing vitality and sex drive" were seized by South Korean customs officials from ethnic Koreans living in China, who had tried to bring them into South Korea to consume the capsules themselves or distribute them to others. Some experts later suggested that the pills may actually have been made of human placenta, as placentophagy is a legal and relatively widespread practice in China.

== Concoctions ==
In Europe, the human blood was normally drunk warm and fresh for increased effectiveness, but some people preferred to have it cooked. Therefore a recipe for turning blood into marmalade was invented. In 1679, a Franciscan apothecary suggested letting the blood partially dry and chopping it into small pieces to allow any remaining water to seep out. Then it was cooked into a batter before sifting it into a jar.

Mummia quickly became popular throughout Europe within the 16th century and was thought to cure all kinds of ailments. To prepare it, the black remnants in the skull and abdominal cavities were scraped out of mummies and placed in a large vase. Apothecaries mixed this mummia with herbs and wine, then prescribed it as medicine for their patients. In Germany, it was still occasionally offered for sale in the early 20th century.

Around the early 1600s, a recipe for a "wine" made from human flesh was invented in Germany. According to this recipe, the body of a human – preferably a young, flawless red-head – was used. The flesh was chopped up and mixed with aloe and myrrh, then mashed and cured into "wine."

== Related practices ==
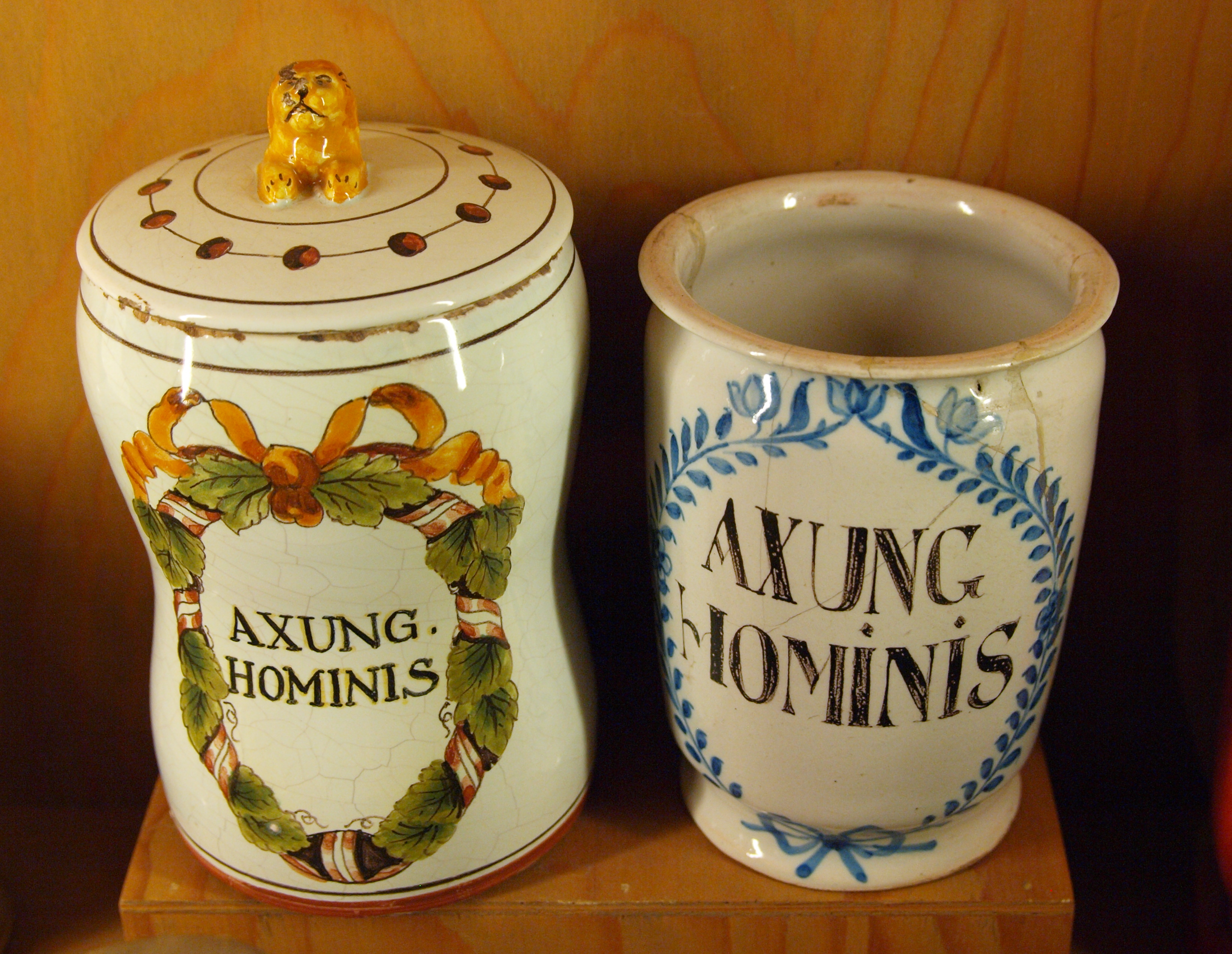
Two apothecary vessels used for human fat, approx. 17th or 18th century

Medicines made from the human body were not always ingested. In early modern Europe, human fat was used to treat problems of the outer body, by either rubbing it directly on the skin or soaking the bandage in fat prior to applying it on the wound.

Especially in the 17th and 18th centuries, "man's grease" was in high demand. Executioners would sell the fat of the people they executed, which would then be melted and filled into vessels. Apothecaries sold it as a remedy for pain, inflammation, rabies, joint problems, and scars. The skin of the executed was also used for medical purposes. Pregnant women placed it around their belly during childbirth because it was thought to reduce birth pains. Others placed it around their neck to prevent thyroid problems.

== See also ==
- Human cannibalism
- Human fat
- Human placentophagy, the consumption of the placenta
- Mellified man
- Mummia
- Traditional Chinese medicines derived from the human body

== Bibliography ==
- Chong, Key Ray (1990). Cannibalism in China. Wakefield, NH: Longwood.
- Dolan, Maria (6 May 2012). "The Gruesome History of Eating Corpses as Medicine". Smithsonian Magazine.
- Kang, Lydia (2017). Quackery: A Brief History of the Worst Ways to Cure Everything. Pedersen, Nate. New York: Workman Publishing. ISBN 978-0-7611-8981-7. OCLC 967202706.
- Korn, Daniel; Radice, Mark; Hawes, Charlie (2001). Cannibal: The History of the People-Eaters. London: Channel 4 Books.
- Noble, Louise Christine (2011). Medicinal Cannibalism in Early Modern English Literature and Culture. New York: Palgrave Macmillan. ISBN 978-0-230-11861-4. OCLC 714086301.
- Siefkes, Christian (2022). Edible People: The Historical Consumption of Slaves and Foreigners and the Cannibalistic Trade in Human Flesh. New York: Berghahn. ISBN 978-1-80073-613-9.
- Sugg, Richard (2016). Mummies, Cannibals and Vampires: The History of Corpse Medicine from the Renaissance to the Victorians (2nd ed.). London: Routledge. ISBN 978-1-138-93400-9.
- Zheng, Yi (2018). Scarlet Memorial: Tales of Cannibalism in Modern China. Taylor & Francis. ISBN 978-0-429-97277-5.
