= Placentophagy =

Act of mammals eating the placenta of their young after childbirth

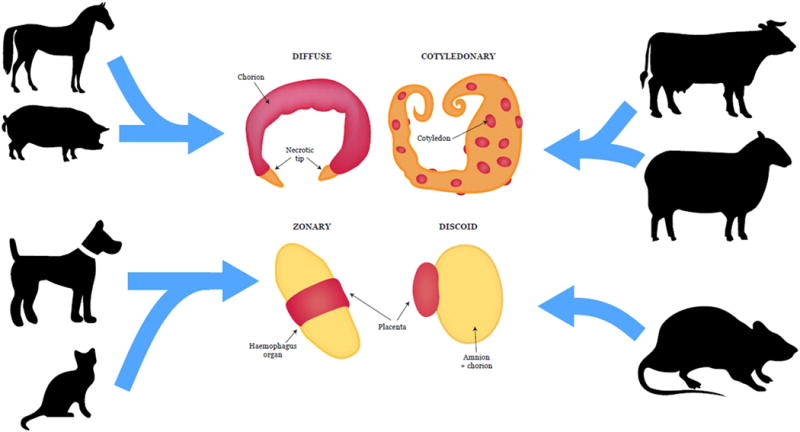
Placental morphologies of varying placental mammals

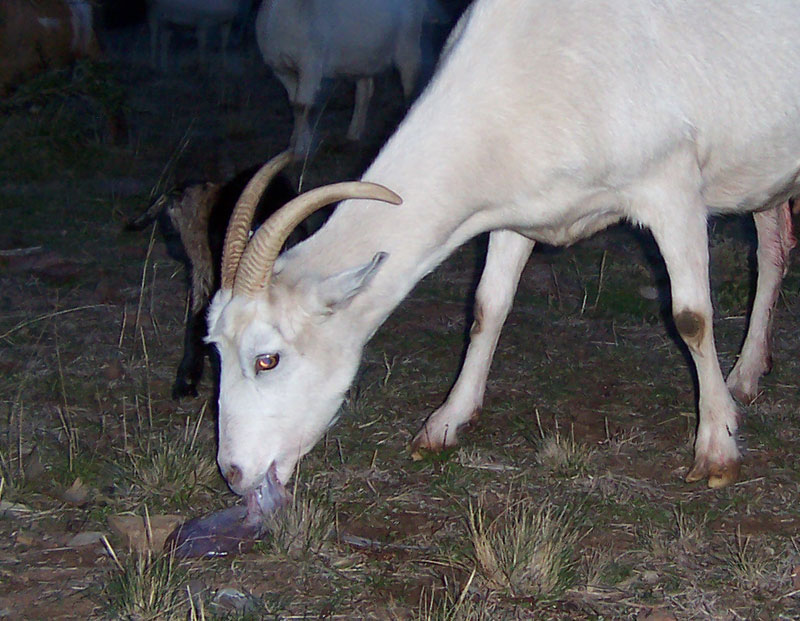
Mother goat engaging in placentophagy

Placentophagy, also known as placentophagia, is the act of consuming part or all of the afterbirth following parturition in mammals. Parturition involves the delivery of the neonate, as well as the placenta and fetal membranes. The placenta is a critical organ that develops in the maternal uterus during pregnancy to support the fetus. It connects to the fetus via the umbilical cord in order to allow nutrient transport, waste excretion and gas exchange between mother and fetus. The morphological features of the placenta differ among species, but the function is universal. The behaviour is characteristic to the mother of the majority of placental mammals. Significant documentation has been provided on placentophagy in a range of animals.

Anomalies generally include humans and aquatic species, as well as camels. However, the concept is becoming more popular among women in the West, despite its controversial overtone.

Theories as to why mammals engage in placentophagy are related to the many proposed benefits of placental consumption. These vary between animals but tend to be behavioural, medical or spiritual in nature.

== Prevalence ==
Placentophagy is a normality in most members of the taxonomic group Eutheria. It has been observed in animals ranging from rodents to primates, and even in some instances humans. The most extensive study has been on animals in orders Rodentia, Chiroptera, Lagomorpha, Carnivora, Perissodactyla, Artiodactyla, and Primates. Exceptions to the ubiquitous behaviour in mammals can be seen in humans, sea mammals and camelids. It is suggested that the portion of marine species that do not practice placentophagy are ones that deliver their offspring in the water because beneficial components are dispersed upon expulsion from the mother, and that the domestication of camelids has eradicated the behaviour by placing stress and selective pressure on the species.

=== In rabbits ===
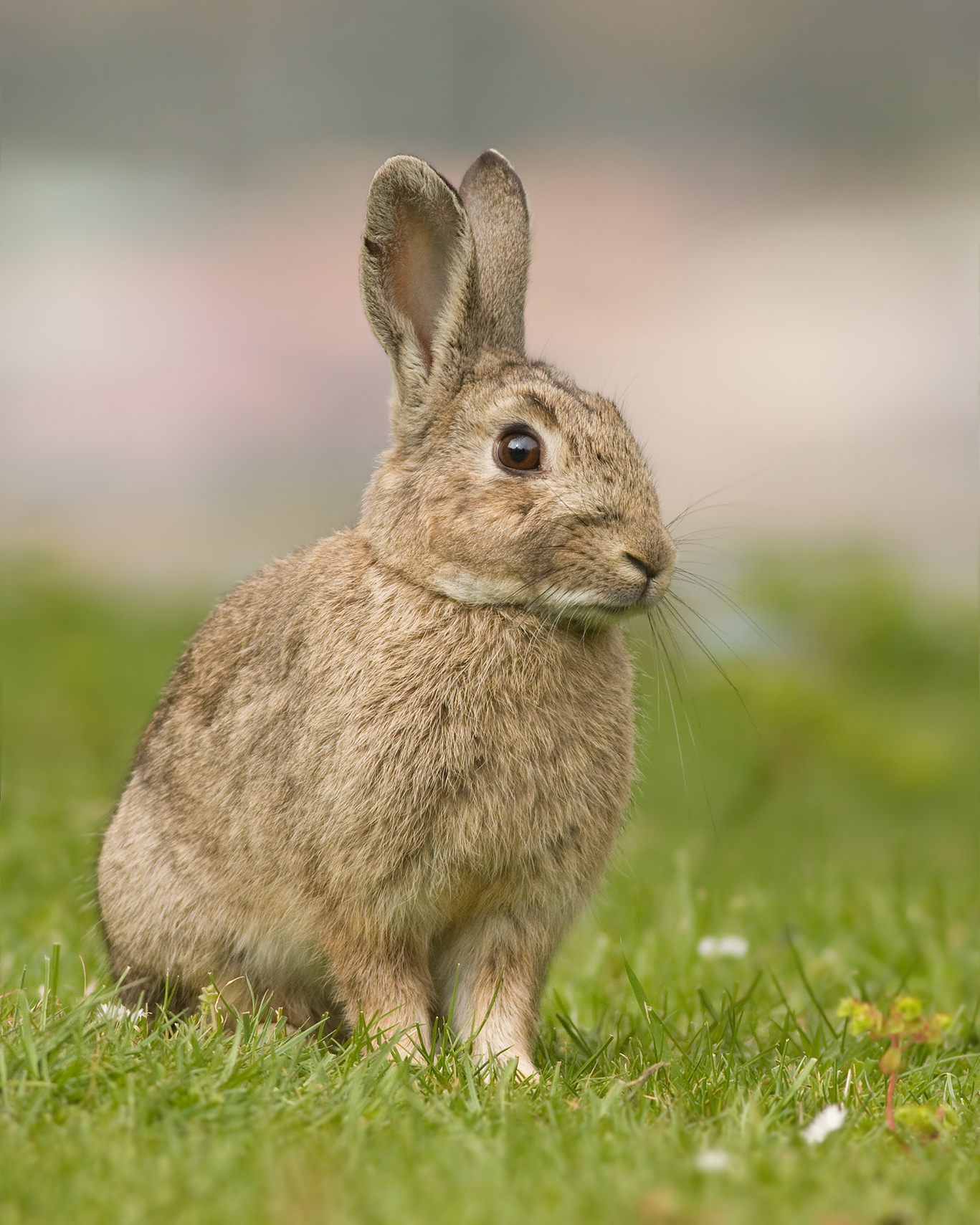
Domestic rabbit, Oryctolagus cuniculus, used as model species in study of placentophagy

Placentophagia in rabbits is exclusively performed by maternal figures that have recently given birth. A study shows that even when pregnant and pre-parturient female rabbits are presented with placental meal there is little participation in the behavior but all postpartum mothers ate the afterbirth. When compared with the consumption of liver, another protein source, the occurrence of placentophagia alone increases by roughly 55% in the short 1–5 day period following parturition. The liver is preferential to non-pregnant, pregnant and pre-parturient mothers consistently as opposed to post-partum mothers who chose to consume only placenta when presented with both. The same study also looked at the interest of the placenta in pregnant rabbits, they saw that in the days leading up to delivery the animals were more intrigued by the placenta when it was presented, which was shown by increasing sniffing of the placenta. The attraction was not demonstrated towards the liver. This infers that there is a tie between elements prompting both delivery and placentophagy in pregnant maternal rabbits. In some instances placentophagia is tied to cannibalism in rabbits. As the mother engages in the act of consuming the placenta, they accidentally ingest the neonate as well.

=== In rats ===
Placentophagia has been studied most commonly in rodents, specifically rats. There have been multiple conclusions drawn from the available literature. One major finding is that the consumption of the afterbirth and associated materials increases the onset and intensity of maternal behavior in rats. The increased contact between the adult and the infant is what enhances the adoption of parental behavior. In addition to increasing the parenting tendencies of mother rats, it has been seen that placentophagia by female weanling laboratory rats when the mother births a subsequent litter, elevates alloparenting behavior toward their siblings. Additional research has shown that ingestion of the placenta and amniotic fluid influences the pain tolerance in pregnant rats via elevation of naturally occurring opioid-mediated analgesia. Production of endogenous opioids produced by the central nervous system, is increased during the birthing process which raises the pain threshold of the mother. When coupled with the ingestion of placenta or amniotic fluid, there is a drastic increase in the opioid effect. A test whereby rats were given meat rather than placenta supported the contribution of the afterbirth components to the enhanced opioid effect by showing no increase in the pain threshold of the post-partum mother.

== Hypothesized benefits ==
There are numerous hypothesized benefits to the practice of placentophagy in both human and nonhuman mammals, which are seen as the direct motivation for various animals to engage in the consumption of the afterbirth. Many of these proposed benefits have since been disproved through scientific study.

=== Satiation of hunger ===
Some initial conjectures related directly to the satiation of specific and general maternal hunger. These hinged on the idea that prior to parturition mothers ceased to eat and so, immediately after birth they consumed the placenta to satisfy an intense hunger. A further idea was that of specific hunger, according to which the maternal figure participated in placentophagy in order to replenish any resources depleted during pregnancy that were contained within the placenta. This was later disproved by studies on rats and other species showing that a wide range of animals do not typically decrease the amount of food or water taken in prior to delivery, and that rats presented with placenta will consume it regardless of pregnancy or virginity.

=== Cleanliness and protection against predation ===
Another aspect of placentophagy that was initially considered a beneficial reason for its occurrence was that the consumption of the afterbirth ensured cleanliness of the nest and eliminated any sign of new and vulnerable offspring. It was suggested that nesting animals, who would then rear their young within the nest, benefited by having an aseptic area. Further, predators would be attracted to the site of parturition by the scent of blood and of fetal tissue, so ingesting the afterbirth would eliminate the ability for predators to easily locate newborns. This would in turn provide protection for the defenseless young. These hypothesized benefits were later rejected because the act of consuming the placenta would be more time-consuming than merely abandoning the site of parturition or removing the afterbirth from the nesting area, each of which would provide the same benefit as placentophagy was presumed to provide.

=== Increased pain threshold ===
A newer hypothesis about the maternal consumption of afterbirth in mammals is that the placenta contains compounds that increase pain tolerance post parturition. Although it is known that during pregnancy and labour there is a natural increase in internal production of enkephalins and endorphins that decrease the sensation of pain, studies indicated that the consumption of placenta by maternal rats after delivery spiked the subsequent numbers of these opioids. This was due to the active ingredient present in the placenta as well as the amniotic fluid, placental opioid-enhancing factor (POEF). Afterbirth also contains amniotic fluid, and scientists believe its consumption may be equally as important in the elevation of pain threshold as is the placental ingestion. Amniotic fluid is likely taken in unknowingly by cleaning the genital area prior or post delivery, or by cleaning or kissing the infant soon after expulsion.

== Evolution ==
Placentophagy evolved independently in different lineages as adaptations to various challenges faced by ancestral species. The behaviour was ultimately attractive to the maternal subject based on the hypothesized benefits discussed above but provided some kind of advantage. Based on this advantage, placentophagy was selected for by natural selection which lead to its persistence in mammal species.

== Human placentophagy ==
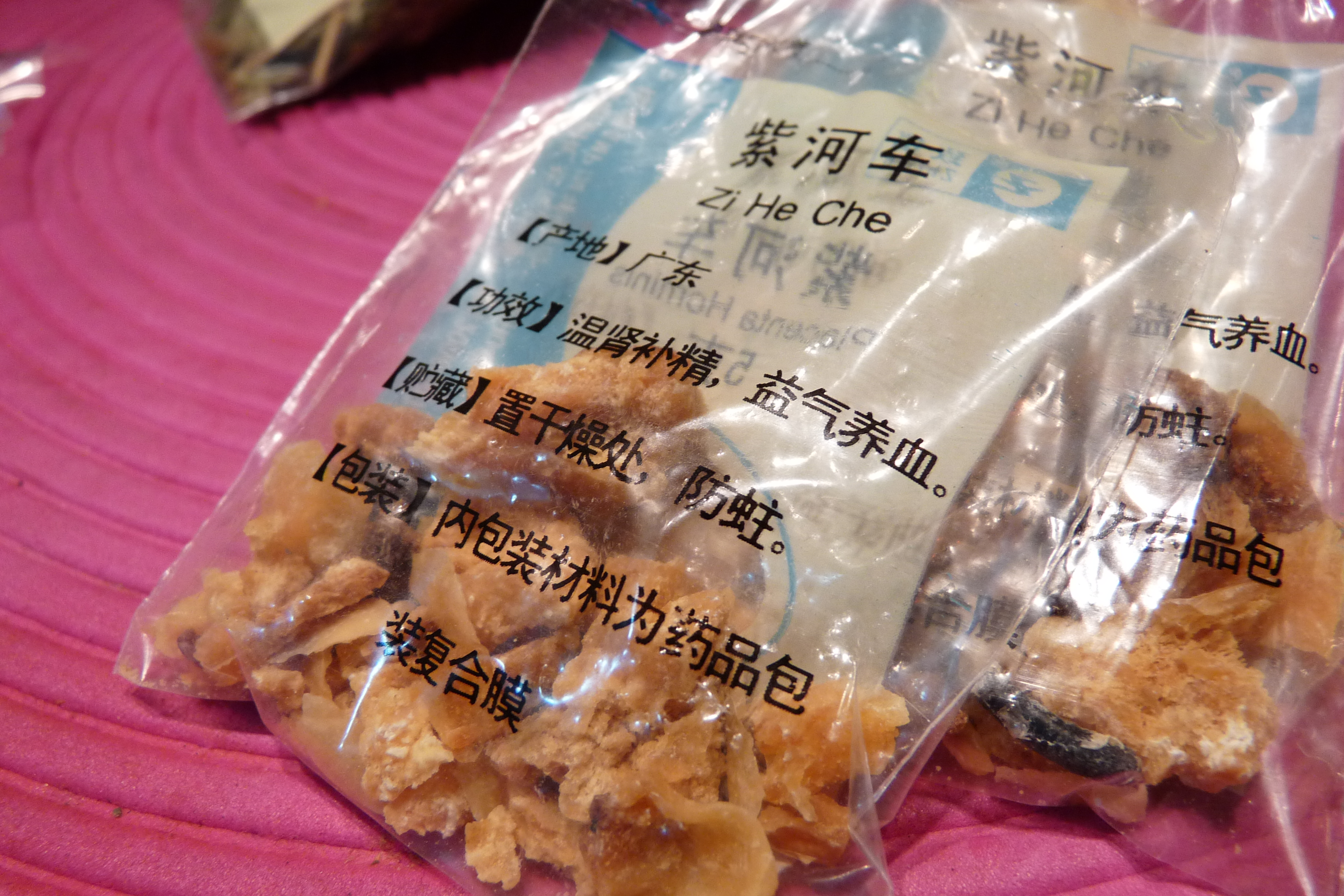
Dried human placenta as medicine (ziheche) (紫河车)

Although the placenta is revered in many cultures, there is scarce evidence that any customarily eat the placenta after the newborn's birth.

Those who advocate placentophagy in humans believe that eating the placenta prevents postpartum depression and other pregnancy complications. Obstetrician and spokesperson for the Royal College of Obstetricians and Gynaecologists Maggie Blott disputes the post-natal depression theory, stating there is no medical reason to eat the placenta: "Animals eat their placenta to get nutrition – but when people are already well-nourished, there is no benefit, there is no reason to do it." While no scientific study has proven any benefits, a survey was conducted by American medical anthropologists at the University of South Florida and University of Nevada, Las Vegas. Among the respondents, about three-fourths claimed to have positive experiences from eating their own placenta, citing "improved mood", "increased energy", and "improved lactation".

Human placenta has also been an ingredient in some traditional Chinese medicines, including using dried human placenta, known as ziheche (simplified Chinese: 紫河车; traditional Chinese: 紫河車; pinyin: Zǐhéchē), to treat wasting diseases, infertility, impotence and other conditions. Most recently, the CDC published a report of a newborn infected with group B Streptococcus (GBS) bacteria likely after the mother ingested placenta capsules. Consequently, the CDC said that placenta capsule ingestion should be avoided and to educate mothers interested in placenta encapsulation about the potential risks. A recent publication advised that physicians should discourage placentophagy because it is potentially harmful with no documented benefit.

British celebrity chef Hugh Fearnley-Whittingstall, known for his series of River Cottage programmes, notoriously cooked and ate a human placenta on one of his programmes.

Pg.104-7 in Cecil Adams's Return of the Straight Dope (1994) describes a home childbirth, followed by placentophagy, in Berkeley, California.

== See also ==
- Autocannibalism
