= Bencao Gangmu =

Chinese herbology book

Compendium of Materia Medica
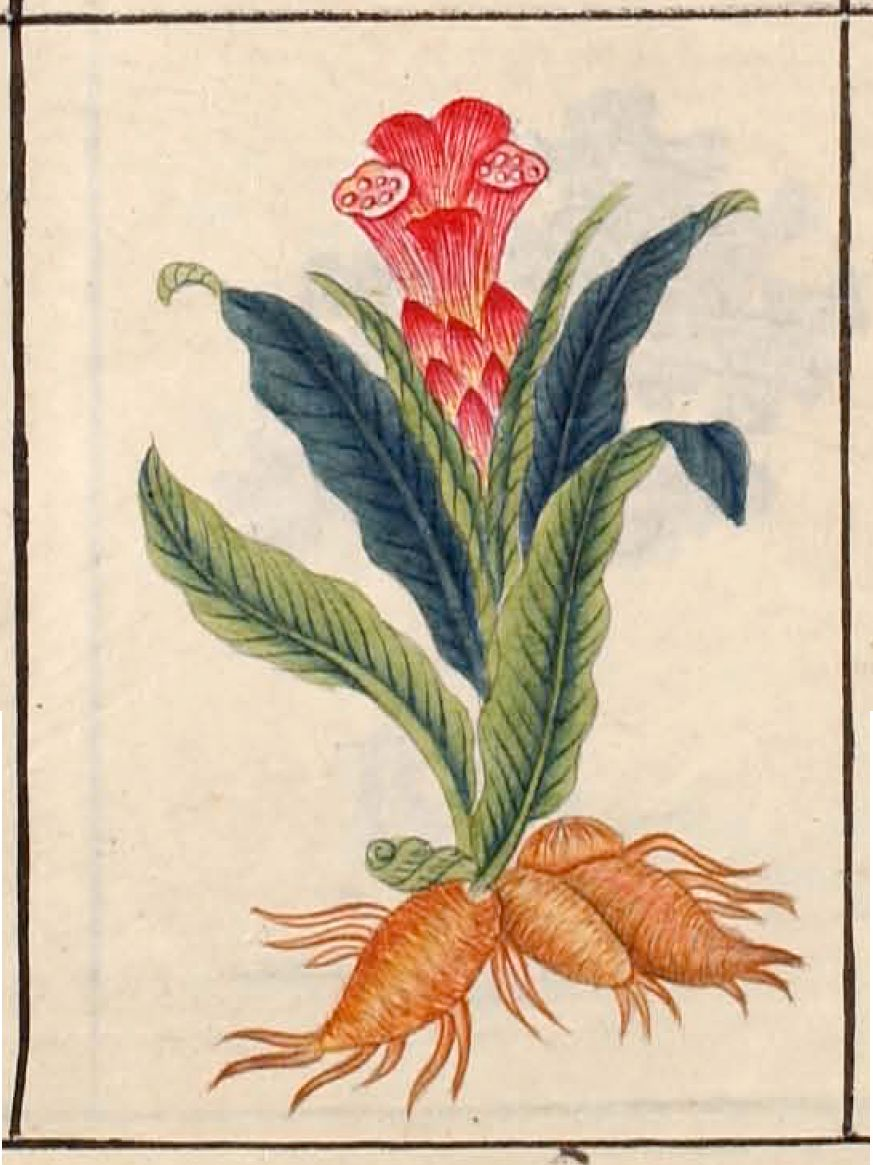
- Illustration from 1800 edition
- Traditional Chinese: 本草綱目
- Simplified Chinese: 本草纲目
- Literal meaning: Principles and Species of Roots and Herbs
Transcriptions
Standard Mandarin
- Hanyu Pinyin: Běncǎo gāngmù
- Wade–Giles: Pen^{3}-ts'ao^{3} kang^{1}-mu^{4}
- IPA: [pə̀n.tsʰàʊ káŋ.mû]
Yue: Cantonese
- Jyutping: bun2 cou2 gong1 muk6

The Bencao gangmu, known in English as the Compendium of Materia Medica or Great Pharmacopoeia, is an encyclopedic gathering of medicine, natural history, and Chinese herbology compiled and edited by Li Shizhen and published in the late 16th century, during the Ming dynasty. Its first draft was completed in 1578 and printed in Nanjing in 1596. The Compendium lists the materia medica of traditional Chinese medicine known at the time, including plants, animals, and minerals that were believed to have medicinal properties.

Li compiled his entries not only from hundreds of earlier works in the bencao medical tradition, but from literary and historical texts. He reasoned that a poem might have better value than a medical work and that a tale of the strange could illustrate a drug's effects. The Ming dynasty emperors did not pay too much attention to his work, and it was ignored.

Li's work contained errors and mistakes due to his limited scientific knowledge at the time. For example, Li claimed that all otters were male and that quicksilver (mercury) was not toxic.

== Name ==
The title, translated as "Materia Medica, Arranged according to Drug Descriptions and Technical Aspects", uses two Chinese compound words. Bencao (Pen-ts'ao; "roots and herbs; based on herbs, pharmacopeia, materia medica") combines ben (本 'origin, basis') and cao (草 'grass, plant, herb'). Gangmu (Kang-mu; 'detailed outline; table of contents') combines gang (kang; 綱 'main rope, hawser; main threads, essential principles') and mu (目 'eye, look; category, division').

The characters 綱 and 目 were later used as 'class' and 'order', respectively, in biological classification.

== History ==
Li Shizhen travelled widely for his field study, combed through more than 800 works of literature, and compiled material from the copious historical bencao literature. He modelled his work on a Song dynasty compilation, especially its use of non-medical texts. He worked for more than three decades, with the help of his son, Li Jianyuan, who drew the illustrations. He finished a draft of the text in 1578, the printer began to carve the blocks in 1593, but it was not published until 1596, three years after Li died. Li Jianyuan presented a copy to the Ming dynasty emperor, who saw it but did not pay much attention. Further editions were then published in 1603, 1606, 1640, and then in many editions, with increasing numbers of illustrations, down to the 21st century.

== Contents ==
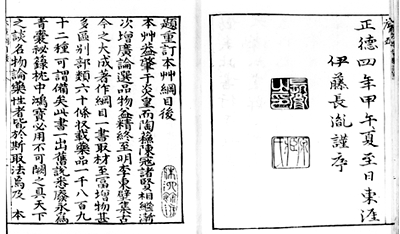
1593 edition

The text consists of 1,892 entries, each entry with its own name called a gang. The mu in the title refers to the synonyms of each name.

The Compendium has 53 volumes in total:

1. The opening table of contents lists entries, including 1,160 hand drawn diagrams and illustrations.
2. Volume 1 to 4 – an index (序例) and a comprehensive list of herbs to treat the most common sicknesses (百病主治藥).
3. Volume 5 to 53 – the main text, contains 1,892 distinct herbs, of which 374 were added by Li Shizhen. There are 11,096 side prescriptions to treat common illness (8,160 of which are compiled in the text).

The text is written in almost 2 million Chinese characters, classified into 16 divisions and 60 orders. For every herb there are entries on their names, a detailed description of their appearance and odor, nature, medical function, side effects, recipes, etc.

== Errors ==
The text contains information that was proven to be wrong due to Li's limited scientific and technical knowledge. For example, it is claimed that quicksilver (mercury) and lead were not toxic. Li also claimed that otters are always male and that the Moupin langur is ten-foot (three-metre) tall, has backwards feet and can be caught when it draws its upper lip over its eyes.

== Evaluation ==
The British historian Joseph Needham writes about the Compendium in his Science and Civilisation in China.

The text provided classification of how traditional medicine was compiled and formatted, as well as biology classification of both plants and animals.

The text corrected some mistakes in the knowledge of herbs and diseases at the time. Several new herbs and more details from experiments were also included. It also has notes and records on general medical data and medical history.

The text includes information on pharmaceutics, biology, chemistry, geography, mineralogy, geology, history, and even mining and astronomy.

== Translations ==
- Li, Shizhen (2024). Catalog of Benevolent Items: Li Shizhen's Compendium of Classical Chinese Knowledge, Selected Entries from the Ben Cao Gang Mu. Translated by Unschuld, Paul U. University of California Press. doi:10.2307/jj.18799932. ISBN 9780520404243. JSTOR jj.18799932.
- Bencao gang mu: 16th Century Chinese Encyclopedia of Materia Medica and Natural History, Bencao gang mu: 16th Century Chinese Encyclopedia of Materia Medica and Natural History Series, Volumes 1–10, translated by Paul Unschild, Berkley: University of California Press

== See also ==
- Chinese herbology
- List of traditional Chinese medicines
- Medical cannibalism
- Mellified man
- Pharmacognosy
- Traditional Chinese medicine
- Traditional Chinese medicines derived from the human body
- Yaoxing lun
- Shanghan Lun
- Xinxiu bencao

== Bibliography ==
- Li Shizhen (2003). Luo, Xiwen (ed.). Compendium of Materia Medica: Bencao Gangmu. Beijing: Foreign Languages Press. ISBN 7119032607. (Review, Edward B. Jelks)
- Métailié, Georges (2001), "The Bencao gangmu of Li Shizhen", in Hsu, Elisabeth (ed.), Innovation in Chinese medicine, Cambridge, UK: Cambridge University Press, pp. 221–261, ISBN 0521800684.
- Nappi, Carla (2009b), "Compendium of Materia Medica", in Cheng, Linsun; Brown, Kerry (eds.), Berkshire Encyclopedia of China, vol. One, Great Barrington, MA: Berkshire, pp. 465–466, ISBN 978-0977015948
- ——— (2009). The Monkey and the Inkpot: Natural History and Its Transformations in Early Modern China. Cambridge, Mass: Harvard University Press. ISBN 9780674035294.
- Unschuld, Paul U. (1986). Medicine in China: A history of Pharmaceutics. Berkeley: University of California Press. ISBN 9780520050259.
- Zhang, Zhibin; Unschuld, Paul U. (2014). Dictionary of the Ben Cao Gang Mu. Vol. I Chinese Historical Illness Terminology. University of California Press. ISBN 9780520283954.
