= Tao Zongyi =

- Traditional Chinese: 陶宗儀
- Simplified Chinese: 陶宗仪
Transcriptions
Standard Mandarin
- Hanyu Pinyin: Táo Zōngyí
- Wade–Giles: T'ao Tsung-i

Courtesy Name
- Chinese: 陶九成
- Literal meaning: Nine-Change Tao
Transcriptions
Standard Mandarin
- Hanyu Pinyin: Táo Jiǔchéng
- Wade–Giles: T'ao Chiu-ch'êng

Style Name
- Chinese: 陶南村
- Literal meaning: Southern-Village Tao
Transcriptions
Standard Mandarin
- Hanyu Pinyin: Táo Náncūn
- Wade–Giles: T'ao Nan-ts'un

Tao Zongyi (c. ad 1320 – c. 1410), also known by his courtesy name Tao Jiucheng and his style name Tao Nancun, was a Chinese scholar during the late Yuan and early Ming dynasties.

== Life ==
Tao Zongyi was born under the Mongolian-ruled Yuan dynasty and grew up in the village of Qingyang (清陽, 清阳, Qīngyáng) in Huangyan County outside Taizhou in Jiangzhe province (now Eastern China's Zhejiang province). However, the exact date of his birth is now obscure, being variously placed in 1316, 1321, 1322, and 1329.

He was a friend and correspondent of many of his era's most famous scholars and writers and may have held some official offices under the Yuan. As that dynasty collapsed, he repeatedly declined further appointments, instead focusing on scholarship and literature. He continued to decline appointments under the early Ming, relocating to Yunjian in Nanzhili (now Songjiang in Shanghai Municipality).

The year of his death is also obscure, being variously placed in 1403, 1407, or 1410.

== Works ==
Tao's known works include the 1361 Environs of Fiction or Persuasion of the Suburbs (t 《說郛》, s 《说郛》, Shuōfú), a compilation of 1292 historical and semihistorical stories; his 1366 historical "novel" Nancun Chuogeng Lu ("Records from a Southern Village after Retiring from the Plow") covering a wide range of topics in the daily life under the late Yuan; his 1376 Important Matters in the History of Calligraphy (t 《書史會要》, s 《书史会要》, Shūshǐ Huìyào), covering the historical development of Chinese characters and other Asian writing systems alongside biographies of prominent calligraphers; the biographical compilation A Private History of Common Heroes (《草莽私乘》, Cǎomǎng Sīchéng); and a book of poems. His works were included in the Ming and Qing compilations the Siku Quanshu, the Sibu Congkan (t 《四部叢刊》, s 《四部丛刊》, Sìbù Cóngkān), and the Baichuan Xuehai (t 《百川學海》, s 《百川学海》, Bǎichuān Xuéhǎi).

== Legacy ==
Tao's life was the subject of a 1374 biography by his friend Sun Zuo (t 孫作, s 孙作, Sūn Zuò) and was among the dynastic biographies included in the official 1739 History of the Ming and in Ke Shaomin's 1920 New History of the Yuan.
