= Chuogeng Lu =

- Traditional Chinese: 《南村輟耕錄》
- Simplified Chinese: 《南村辍耕录》
- Literal meaning: Records from a Southern Village after Retiring from the Plow
Transcriptions
Standard Mandarin
- Hanyu Pinyin: Náncūn Chuògēng Lù
- Wade–Giles: Nan-ts'un Ch'o-kêng Lu

Cover of a copy of Chuogeng lu, full name Nancun Chuogeng Lu

The Chuogeng Lu, or known by its full name Nancun Chuogeng Lu, was 30-volume Chinese text that serves as an account of daily life under the late Yuan dynasty, compiled by the scholar Tao Zongyi. It was begun in 1366 and expanded in pieces until his death under the Ming in the early 15th century.
