= List of traditional Chinese medicines =

The following is a list of traditional Chinese medicines as well as those used in the related systems of Japanese Kampo, Traditional Korean Medicine, and Vietnamese Thuoc Bac (Northern Medicine). Chinese herbology studies the use of these materials.

TCM and allied systems mainly makes use of plant elements and extracts. Animal (including human) parts and excreta as well as inorganic minerals are used as well. There are roughly 13,000 medicinals used in China and over 100,000 medicinal prescriptions recorded in the ancient literature. In Korea, more than 5000 herbs and 7000 herbal formulas are used.

== Mammals ==
=== Human parts and excreta ===
Human body parts and excreta have been used in TCM since ancient times. More common ones include a remedy made from licorice and human feces, dried human placenta, finger nails, child's urine, hair, and adult urinary sediments (Hominis Urinae Sedimentum, Ren Zhong Bai). Uncommon parts include pubic hair, muscle, blood, bone, semen, and menstrual blood. The Bencao Gangmu describes the use of 35 human waste products and body parts as medicines, such as bones, fingernail, hairs, dandruff, earwax, impurities on the teeth, feces, urine, sweat, and organs. - Also listed are human breath and the "soul of criminals that were hanged", which is considered under TCM to be a material object resembling charcoal that is dug out of the ground beneath the body shortly after a hanged criminal died.

Very few human or allegedly human products remain in TCM today.

There is considerable controversy about the ethics of use of criminals for body parts, using humans as commodities, and consumption of human body parts which some consider to be cannibalism.

==== Dried human placenta ====
Dried human placenta is believed to treat male impotence, male and female infertility, chronic cough, asthma, and insomnia.

==== Human feces and urine ====
The contemporary use of licorice in prepared human feces is known as Ren Zhong Huang. Human urine sediment is called Ren Zhong Bai. Both Ren Zhong Huang and Ren Zhong Bai are used to treat inflammatory conditions and fungal infections of the skin and mouth.

==== Human penis ====
The human penis is not a drug.

— Li Shizhen

Human penis was previously believed under TCM to stop bleeding, and as with other TCM medicines, the basis for belief in its therapeutic effects is anecdotal and not based on the scientific method; Li Shizhen, author of the greatest pharmacological work in pre-modern China, the Bencao Gangmu, objected to use of human penis, but cited the anecdotal evidence and thus included it in his book.

==== Human pubic hair ====
Human pubic hair ("shady hair") was claimed to cure snakebite, difficult birth, abnormal urination, and "yin and yang disorder" (A disease unique to TCM based on traditional Chinese views of sexual behavior).

=== Donkey-hide gelatin ===
Gelatin made from the hide of donkeys (ejiao) is made into pellets for use in making teas.

=== Deer penis ===
Deer penis is commonly sold in pharmacies. and served in specialized restaurants such as the Guo Li Zhuang restaurant in Beijing. The deer penis is typically very large and some proponents believe it must be extracted from the deer whilst still alive. Often it is then sliced into small pieces, typically by women and then roasted and dried in the sun and then preserved.

China banned deer penis wine during the 2008 Summer Olympics, as it is believed that the wine is an effective treatment for athletic injuries.

=== Flying squirrel feces ===
Flying squirrel feces is used to stop bleeding.

The text Chinese Medical Herbology and Pharmacology notes that flying squirrel feces has a "distinct odor" that "may decrease patient compliance" with ingesting it.

It is believed to have uses for amenorrhea, menses pain, postpartum abdominal pain, epigastric pain, and chest pain. It is boiled in a decoction with other herbs prior to ingestion. If it is to be used in a formula to stop heavy bleeding; it is dry fried prior to further processing. Exposure to flying squirrels in the wild has been associated with Rickettsia infections.

=== Pangolin scales ===
Scales of pangolins, Chuan Shan Jia [Manitis Squama], are used in traditional Chinese medicine. is classified as salty and cool and as entering the Liver and Stomach channels. It is traditionally used in Chinese medicine to disperse blood stasis (for promoting menstruation and lactation), reducing swelling and promoting discharge of pus (for abscesses and boils etc.) and for expelling wind-dampness (for pain due to rehumatism/arthritis).

=== Rhinoceros horn ===
The horn of a rhinoceros is used as an antipyretic - because it is believed to "cool the blood" - however several scientific studies failed to find any active Antipyretic Molecule in rhinoceros horn. The black market trade of rhinoceros parts has decimated the world's population by more than 90 percent over the past 40 years.

=== Tiger penis ===
The penis and testicles of male tigers is used by some to treat erectile dysfunction and to improve sexual performance, despite tiger penis being a placebo. Critically endangered species such as the Sumatran tiger are often being hunted to keep up with the illegal demand for tiger parts.

== Reptiles and amphibians ==
=== Snake oil ===
Snake oil is the most widely known Chinese medicine in the west, due to extensive marketing in the west in the late 1800s and early 1900s, and wild claims of its efficacy to treat many maladies. Snake oil is a traditional Chinese medicine used to treat joint pain by rubbing it on joints as a liniment.

This is theoretically possible because snake oil is higher in eicosapentaenoic acid than most other oils. But there are no scientific studies showing that rubbing it on joints has any positive effect, or that snake oil is safe for daily consumption.

=== Toad secretions ===
The secretions of various species of toads are an ingredient in certain traditional Chinese teas. However, these teas may contain deadly amounts of cardiac glycosides and thus should be avoided.

=== Toad-headed gecko ===
Toad-head geckos are gutted, beheaded, dried and then crushed, and are used to treat asthma, male impotence and the common cold.

=== Turtle shell ===
Widespread medicinal use of turtle shells is of concern to conservationists.

== Marine life ==
=== Seahorse ===
Seahorse (Hai Ma) is a fundamental ingredient in therapies for a variety of disorders, including asthma, arteriosclerosis, incontinence, impotence, insomnia, thyroid disorders, skin ailments, broken bones, heart disease, throat infections, abdominal pain, sores, skin infections; it is also used as an aphrodisiac and to facilitate childbirth. As many as 20 million seahorses per year may be used for TCM purposes. In one study, 58 seahorse samples were collected from various TCM vendors in Taiwan, and of all the eight species identified from the fifty-eight samples, seven were vulnerable, and one was endangered.

=== Shark fin soup ===
Shark fin soup is traditionally regarded as beneficial for health in East Asia, and its status as an elite dish has led to huge demand with the increase of affluence in China, devastating shark populations.

== Insects ==
=== Blister beetle ===
Blister beetles (Ban mao) are believed under TCM to treat skin lesions, because they cause them. They contain the blister agent cantharidin.

Some species of blister beetles include; Margined blister beetle, and twenty-five hundred more.

=== Centipede ===
Powdered centipede (wu gong) is believed under TCM to treat tetanus, seizures, convulsions, skin lesions, and pain. It is toxic. The Chinese red-headed centipede (Scolopendra sunspinipes mutilans) is the only registered species for clinical application in China.

=== Hornets nest ===
Hornets nest (lu feng fang) is used to treat skin disorders and ringworm. It may be toxic.

=== Leech ===
Hirudo medicinalis is used in TCM to treat amenorrhea, abdominal and chest pain, and constipation.

=== Scorpion ===
Dried scorpions (Chinese: 全蠍; pinyin: quán xiē) may be ground into a powder and mixed with water. It is said to aid in detoxification A scorpion venom peptide was found to help with arthritis in vitro.

== Fungi ==
Various fungi are used in TCM. Some may have scientifically proven medicinal value, while others may be extremely toxic.

=== Supernatural mushroom ===
The supernatural mushroom (lingzhi mushroom, Chinese "linh chi" = "supernatural mushroom", "reishi mushroom" in Japan) encompasses several fungal species of the genus Ganoderma, and most commonly refers to the closely related species, Ganoderma lucidum and Ganoderma tsugae. G. lucidum enjoys special veneration in East Asia, where it has been used as a medicinal mushroom in traditional Chinese medicine for more than 2,000 years, making it one of the oldest mushrooms known to have been used medicinally. Today, the ling zhi mushroom is used in a herbal formula designed to minimize the side effects of chemotherapy.

Extracts of the mushroom are used as a commercial pharmaceutical to suppress cancer cell proliferation and migration, although the mechanisms by which this is achieved are currently unknown.

=== Lion's Mane ===
Used in traditional Chinese medicine for centuries, Hericium erinaceus is commonly marketed as a dietary supplement for its purported benefits to memory, and it is not known by NIH as a toxicant to the liver.

=== Tremella fuciformis ===
Tremella fuciformis is used as a beauty product by women in China and Japan as it reportedly increases moisture retention in the skin and prevents senile degradation of micro-blood vessels in the skin, reducing wrinkles and smoothing fine lines. Other beneficial effects come from its ability to increase the activity of SOD in the brain and liver.

=== Caterpillar Fungus ===
The caterpillar fungus (Ophiocordyceps sinensis) as a medicine was initially used by Tibetans no later than the fifteenth century, and was later assimilated into Chinese materia medica from the eighteenth century onwards.

== Plants ==
There are thousands of plants that are used as medicines. The following list represents a very small portion of the TCM pharmacopoeia.

=== Monkshood root ===
Monkshood root is commonly used in TCM. It was once so commonly used it was called "the king of the 100 herbs".

The monkshood plant contains what is called "the queen of poisons", the highly toxic alkaloid aconitine. Aconitine is easily absorbed through the skin, eyes and through the lining of the nose; Death may occur through respiratory paralysis. A few minutes after exposure, paresthesia starts at the mouth and slowly beings to cover the whole body, Anesthesia, hot and cold flashes, nausea and vomiting and other similar symptoms follow. Sometimes there is strong pain, accompanied by cramps, or diarrhea.

When a person has a negative reaction to the alkaloid, some practitioners of classical Chinese medicine think that this is because it was that the monkshood plant was processed incorrectly or planted on the wrong place or on the wrong day of the year; not because of an overdose.

The Chinese also used aconitine both for hunting and for warfare.

=== Birthworts ===
Birthworts (family Aristolochiaceae) are often used to treat many ailments, including hypertension, hemorrhoids, and colic. However, they are of little medicinal value and contain the carcinogen aristolochic acid. The over-use of this plant family in TCM is thought be a significant cause of upper urinary tract cancer and kidney failure in Taiwan; in 2012, approximately a third of all herbal prescriptions in Taiwan contained AA. Supplements containing AA may be responsible for BEN.

=== Camellia sinensis ===
Tea from India, Sri Lanka, Java and Japan is used in TCM for aches and pains, digestion, depression, detoxification, as an energizer and, to prolong life.

=== Cayenne pepper ===
Cayenne pepper is believed under TCM to be a prophylactic medicine.

=== Chinese cucumber ===
The fruit of Trichosanthes kirilowii is believed to treat tumors, reduce fevers, swelling and coughing, abscesses, amenorrhea, jaundice, and polyuria. The plant is deadly if improperly prepared; causing pulmonary edema, cerebral hemorrhage, seizures, and high fever.

=== Chrysanthemum flowers ===
Chrysanthemum flowers (Ju Hua) are used in TCM to treat headaches, fever, dizziness and dry eyes. They are also used to make certain beverages. Chrysanthemum flowers are believed to "brighten the eyes, pacify the liver, break blood, clear heat, stop dysentery, disperse wind, relieve toxicity, and regulate the center".

=== Cocklebur fruit ===
Cocklebur fruit (Xanthium strumarium, 蒼耳子, cang er zi) is one of the most important herbs in TCM, and is commonly to treat sinus congestion, chronic nasal obstructions and discharges, and respiratory allergies.

The plant is mildly toxic and can cause gastrointestinal upset.

=== Crow dipper ===
Pinellia ternata is believed under TCM to be the strongest of all TCM herbs for removing phlegm.

Active ingredients of this herb include: methionine, glycine, β-aminobutyric acid, γ-aminobutyric acid, ephedrine, trigonelline, phytosterols and glucoronic acid.

Care should be taken as crow dipper is toxic.

=== Croton seed ===
Seeds of Croton tiglium are used in TCM to treat gastrointestinal disorders, convulsions, and skin lesions. They are often used with rhubarb, dried ginger and apricot seed. Care should be taken as the seeds are toxic and carcinogenic.

=== Dioscorea root ===
In TCM, Dioscorea Root (Radix Dioscorea, Huai Shan Yao or Shan Yao in Chinese), benefits both the Yin and Yang, and is used to tonify the lungs, spleen and kidney. It can "be used in large amounts and 30g is suggested when treating diabetes". If taken habitually, it "brightens the intellect and prolongs life".

=== Ginger ===
Ginger root, Zingiber officinale, has been used in China for over 2,000 years to treat indigestion, upset stomach, diarrhea, and nausea. It is also used in TCM to treat arthritis, colic, diarrhea, heart conditions, the common cold, flu-like symptoms, headaches, and menstrual cramps. Today, health care professionals worldwide commonly recommend ginger to help prevent or treat nausea and vomiting associated with motion sickness, pregnancy, and cancer chemotherapy. It is also used as a treatment for minor stomach upset, as a supplement for arthritis, and may even help prevent heart disease and cancer.

=== Ginkgo ===
Ginkgo biloba seeds are crushed and believed under TCM to treat asthma. G. biloba has been used by humans for nearly 5,000 years. However, further scientific studies are needed to establish the efficacy of G. biloba as a medicine.

=== Ginseng ===
Ginseng root is the most widely sold traditional Chinese medicine. The name "ginseng" is used to refer to both American (Panax quinquefolius) and Asian or Korean ginseng (P. ginseng), which belong to the species Panax and have a similar chemical makeup. Siberian ginseng or Eleuthero (Eleutherococcus senticosus) is another type of plant. Asian ginseng has a light tan, gnarled root that often looks like a human body with stringy shoots for arms and legs. In ancient times, herbalists thought that because of the way ginseng looks it could treat many different kinds of syndromes, from fatigue and stress to asthma and cancer. In traditional Chinese medicine, ginseng was often combined with other herbs and used often to bring longevity, strength, and mental alacrity to its users. Asian ginseng is believed to enhance the immune system in preventing and treating infection and disease. Several clinical studies report that Asian ginseng can improve immune function. Studies have found that ginseng seems to increase the number of immune cells in the blood, and improve the immune system's response to a flu vaccine. In one study, 227 participants received either ginseng or placebo for 12 weeks, with a flu shot administered after 4 weeks. The number of colds and flu were two-thirds lower in the group that took ginseng.

Ginseng contains stimulants, but may produce side effect including high blood pressure, low blood pressure, and mastalgia. Ginseng may also lead to induction of mania in depressed patients who mix it with antidepressants. One of the most common and characteristic symptoms of acute overdose of ginseng from the genus Panax is bleeding. Symptoms of mild overdose with Panax ginseng may include dry mouth and lips, excitation, fidgeting, irritability, tremor, palpitations, blurred vision, headache, insomnia, increased body temperature, increased blood pressure, edema, decreased appetite, increased sexual desire, dizziness, itching, eczema, early morning diarrhea, bleeding, and fatigue. Symptoms of gross overdose with Panax ginseng may include nausea, vomiting, irritability, restlessness, urinary and bowel incontinence, fever, increased blood pressure, increased respiration, decreased sensitivity and reaction to light, decreased heart rate, cyanotic facial complexion, red face, seizures, convulsions, and delirium.

The constituents of ginseng include triterpene saponins, aglycone protopanaxadiol, aglycone protopanaxytriol, aglycone oleanolic acid and water-soluble polysaccharides.

=== Goji berry ===
Marketing literature for goji berry (wolfberry) products including several "goji juices" suggest that wolfberry polysaccharides have extensive biological effects and health benefits, although none of these claims have been supported by peer-reviewed research.

A May 2008 clinical study published by the peer-reviewed Journal of Alternative and Complementary Medicine indicated that parametric data, including body weight, did not show significant differences between subjects receiving Lycium barbarum berry juice and subjects receiving the placebo; the study concluded that subjective measures of health were improved and suggested further research in humans was necessary. This study, however, was subject to a variety of criticisms concerning its experimental design and interpretations.

Published studies have also reported possible medicinal benefits of Lycium barbarum, especially due to its antioxidant properties, including potential benefits against cardiovascular and inflammatory diseases, vision-related diseases (such as age-related macular degeneration and glaucoma), having neuroprotective properties or as an anticancer and immunomodulatory agent.

Wolfberry leaves may be used to make tea, together with Lycium root bark (called dìgǔpí; 地 骨 皮 in Chinese), for traditional Chinese medicine (TCM). A glucopyranoside isolated from wolfberry root bark have inhibitory activity in vitro against human pathogenic bacteria and fungi.

=== Horny goat weed ===
Horny goat weed (Yin Yang Huo, 淫羊藿) may have use in treating erectile dysfunction. Exploitation of wild populations may have a serious impact on the surrounding environment.

=== Lily bulb ===
Lily bulbs (Bai He) are used in TCM to treat dry cough, dry and sore throat, and wheezing.

=== Pear ===
Qiu Li Gao or Autumn Pear Syrup or Sydney Paste is a pear syrup or paste used in Chinese food therapy.

=== Qiliqiangxin ===
Qiliqiangxin (QLQX, Chinese: 气力强心; pinyin: qī lǐ qiáng xīn; lit. 'strengthening the heart through energy and power') is a traditional Chinese medicine formula used in the treatment of chronic heart failure. It is composed of a standardized extract prepared from eleven herbs commonly utilized in TCM. The formulation was approved by the Chinese Food and Drug Administration in 2004 and has been included in China's heart failure management guidelines since 2014.

=== Chinese Rhubarb ===
The root of the "Chinese rhubarb", or "da huang" (大黄), either Rheum palmatum, or Rheum officinale, is an important herb that is used primarily as a laxative in TCM. The degree of potency depends on how long the root is cooked during preparation after harvesting.

=== Round cardamon fruit ===
Round cardamon fruit (Bai Dou Kou) is used in TCM to treat poor appetite, breathing problems, vomiting and diarrhea

=== Thunder god vine ===
Thunder god vine is used in TCM to treat arthritis, relieve pain and reduce joint swelling. It can be extremely toxic, if not processed properly. If used inappropriately, within two to three hours after ingestion, a patient may begin to have diarrhea, headache, dizziness, severe vomiting (sometimes with blood), chills, high fever, and irregular heart beat. Long term improper use may result in nervous system damage.

=== Trichosanthis root ===
In TCM, Trichosanthis Root (Radix Trichosanthis or Tian Hua Fen in Chinese), is used to clear heat, generate fluids when heat injures fluids causing thirst, in the wasting and thirsting syndrome. The pairing of Tian Hua Fen and Zhi Mu had a faster, stronger and longer effect in reducing blood sugar levels than either herb alone.

=== Strychnine ===
The seeds of the Strychnine tree, Strychnos nux-vomica, are sometimes used to treat diseases of the respiratory tract, anemia, and geriatric complaints. The active molecule is strychnine, a compound often used as a pesticide. Strychnine can also be used as a stimulant - however it has an extremely low therapeutic index and better, less toxic replacements are available.

=== Sweet wormwood ===
Sweet wormwood (Artemisia annua, Qing Hao) is believed under TCM to treat fever, headache, dizziness, stopping bleeding, and alternating fever and chills.

Sweet wormwood had fallen out of common use under TCM until it was rediscovered in the 1970s when the Chinese Handbook of Prescriptions for Emergency Treatments (340 AD) was found. This pharmacopeia contained recipes for a tea from dried leaves, prescribed for fevers (not specifically malaria). The plant extracts often used in TCM are antimalarial, due to the presence of artemisinin.

However, it has been questioned as to whether tea made from A. annua is effective against malaria, since artemesinin is not soluble in water and the resulting tea would not be expected to contain any significant amount of artemesinin.

=== Willow bark ===
Plants of the genus Salix have been used since the time of Hippocrates (400 BC) when patients were advised to chew on the bark to reduce fever and inflammation. Willow bark has been used throughout the centuries in China and Europe to the present for the treatment of pain (particularly low back pain and osteoarthritis), headache, and inflammatory conditions such as bursitis and tendinitis. The bark of white willow contains salicin, which is a chemical similar to aspirin (acetylsalicylic acid). It is thought to be responsible for the pain-relieving and anti-inflammatory effects of the herb. In 1829, salicin was used to develop aspirin. White willow appears to be slower than aspirin to bring pain relief, but the analgesia may last longer.

== Inorganic chemicals and minerals ==
=== Arsenic ===
Arsenic sulfide (Xiong Huang) is a toxic mineral used in TCM to kill parasitic worms and treat sore throats, swellings, abscesses, itching, rashes, and malaria.

Arsenic, while possibly essential for life in tiny amounts, is extremely toxic in the amounts used and arsenic poisoning may result from use of arsenic containing remedies. They are most commonly given as a pill or capsule, although are sometimes incorporated into a mixture with other substances.

=== Lead ===
Galena is used in TCM to treat ringworm, skin disorders and ulcers, and is thought to "detoxify" the body. It is crushed and taken orally or used on the skin. Lead tetroxide (Qian Dan) is used to treat anxiety, itching, and malaria. Most lead compounds are extremely toxic.

=== Mercury ===
==== Cinnabar ====
Despite its toxicity, mercury sulfide (cinnabar) has historically been used in Chinese medicine, where it is called zhūshā (朱砂), and was highly valued in Chinese Alchemy. It was also referred to as dān (丹), meaning all of Chinese alchemy, cinnabar, and the "elixir of immortality". Cinnabar has been used in Traditional Chinese medicine as a sedative for more than 2000 years, and has been shown to have sedative and toxic effects in mice. In addition to being used for insomnia, cinnabar is thought to be effective for cold sores, sore throat, and some skin infections.

==== Corrosive sublimate ====
Mercury(II) chloride (Qing Fen) is used in TCM to "detoxify" the body, kill intestinal parasites, and as a mild tranquilizer.

== See also ==
- Langgan
- Processing (Chinese materia medica)
- Pharmacognosy
- Alternative medicine
