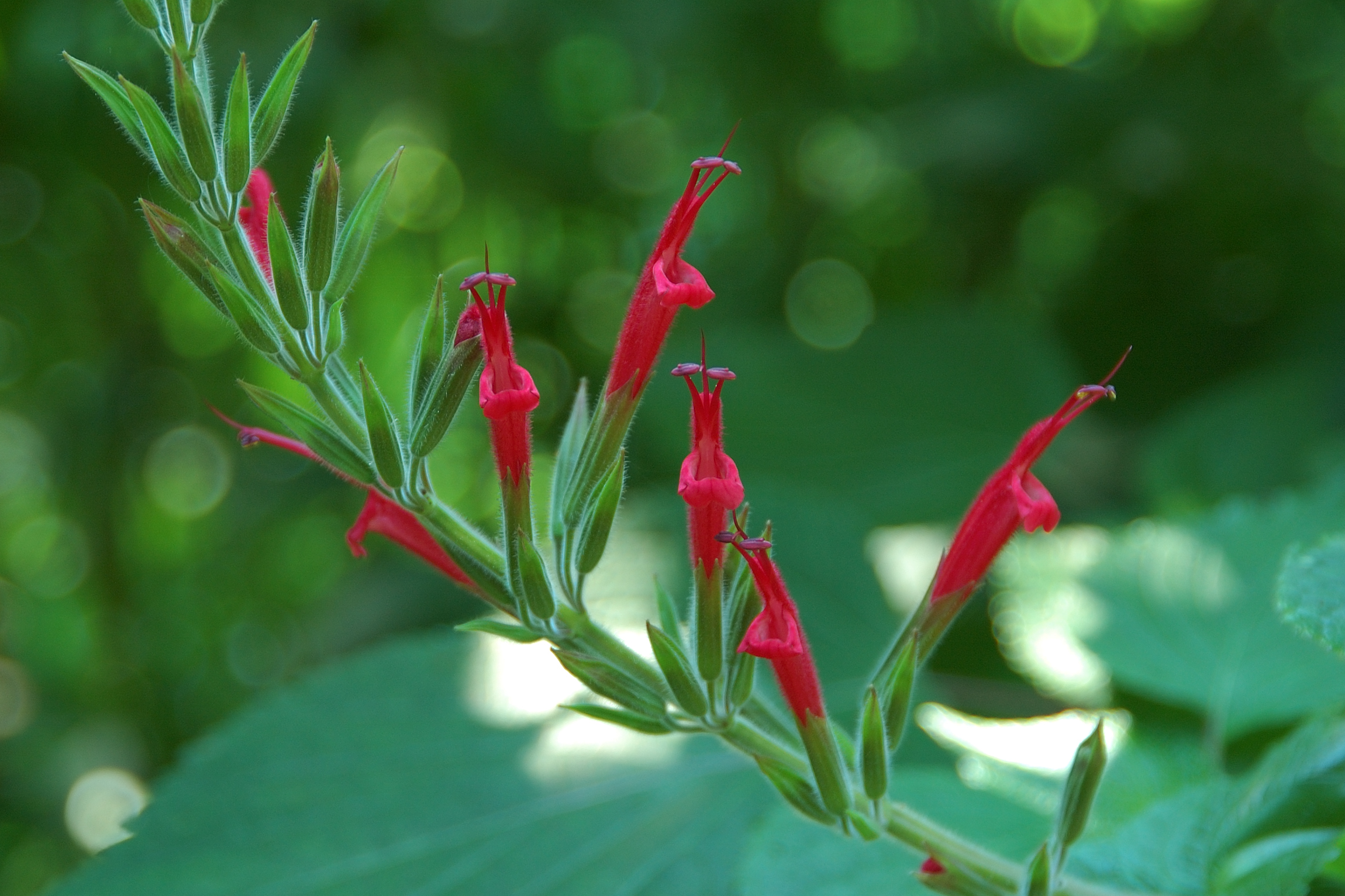

Scientific classification
- Kingdom: Plantae
- Clade: Tracheophytes
- Clade: Angiosperms
- Clade: Eudicots
- Clade: Asterids
- Order: Lamiales
- Family: Lamiaceae
- Genus: Salvia
- Species: S. elegans

Binomial name
- Salvia elegans Vahl

Synonyms
- Salvia rutilans Carrière

= Salvia elegans =

Species of shrubs

Salvia elegans is a perennial shrub native to Mexico. It has a number of variants, including pineapple sage and tangerine sage.

== Description ==
Pineapple sage is a short-day plant that produces numerous erect leafy stems up to 150 centimetres (59 in). The leaves have an attractive scent that is similar to pineapple. The flowering season in Mexico is August onward; further north it may not flower until later autumn; if there is no frost, it may flower until spring. It has tubular red flowers.

The variety 'Honey Melon', which has the same pineapple fragrance in the leaves, blooms early in the summer, rather than in autumn.

Tangerine sage grows to about 60–90 cm (24–35 in) tall, has bronze edged leaves and a citrus scent. It is summer flowering.

=== Phytochemistry ===
The essential oil of S. elegans consists primarily of caffeic acid and its derivatives, such as rosmarinic acid and salvianolic acid, and flavones.

== Distribution and habitat ==
Native to Mexico, the shrub inhabits Madrean and Mesoamerican pine–oak forests between 1,800 and 2,700 m (6,000 and 9,000 ft).

== Ecology ==
The red tubular flowers are attractive to different species of hummingbirds, butterflies, bees, beetles, and flies, with hummingbirds being the primary pollinator. In a highland temperate forest in central Mexico, pineapple sage was found to be one of the three most-visited species by hummingbirds. The plant's pollination syndrome, having longer upper lips compared to the lower lips, is associated with other ornithophilous species, believed to have been shaped over time by their primary pollinators. Pineapple sage has a close relationship with hummingbirds due to their similar elevational distribution and constraints. The numerous flowers each plant produces makes pineapple sage a great food source for hummingbirds, as they require large amounts of nectar to sustain themselves. However, this morphological trait may promote a type of fertilization called geitonogamy, as hummingbirds visit multiple flowers of the same plant.

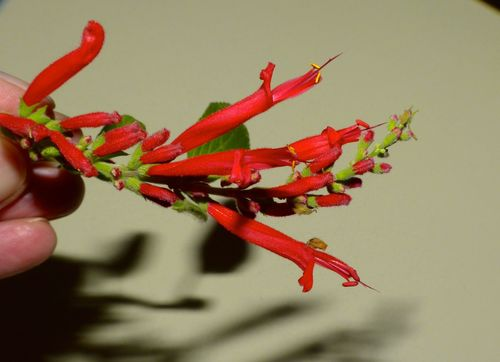
Salvia elegans, photo taken by Steve Kerr

S. elegans displays incomplete dichogamy, where there is a slight temporal overlap between when the anthers release pollen and when the stigmas are receptive for pollen. In this species' case, the anthers develop pollen before their stigmas are receptive. While this strategy may allow for self pollination and possibly inbreeding depression, it mainly selects for allogamy. Inbreeding depression was not shown to occur for this species in one study in pre-germination stages. The display of incomplete dichogamy behavior may ensure for fruit and seed production when conditions are less ideal or when individuals are spread far apart from one another. The act of selfing is reduced by the flower's herkogamy, where the stigma is located above the pollen filled anthers.

== Cultivation ==
Pineapple sage was introduced into horticulture about 1870. In cultivation, it typically reaches a height of 1.2 to 1.5 m (4 to 5 ft), with its roots spreading underground to form a large clump. The pale yellow-green leaves are veined and covered with fine hairs. Six to twelve scarlet flowers grow in whorls, featuring a long inflorescence that blooms gradually and lasts for an extended period. With a hard frost, the plant will die down to the ground and grow back the following spring.

== Uses ==
The leaves and flowers are edible. Both its leaves and flowers are used in flavoring fruit salads, jams, teas, and as garnish.

The plant is used in Mexican traditional medicine, where common usages of pineapple sage as a medicinal plant include treatment of stomach pain, insomnia, edema, and culturally defined illnesses such as mal de aire and espanto. Mal de aire is a condition traditionally attributed to small, invisible entities carried by the wind, and espanto, an illness believed to arise from a sudden and intense fright. For both conditions, the plant is boiled with other herbs known as toronjiles and administered as a tea or bath. For insomnia, infusions prepared from the leaves and flowers are drunken. The Pame indigenous people of central Mexico (San Luis Potosí and Queretaro) refer to the plant as yerba del burro (donkey herb) and have historically used this plant to treat headaches for adults experiencing high emotional stress, which manifests in ringing or buzzing in the ears, as well as dizziness.
