= Danshensu =

Names
- IUPAC name (2R)-3-(3,4-Dihydroxyphenyl)lactic acid
- Other names Salvianic acid A

Identifiers
CAS Number	76822-21-4; Na salt: 67920-52-9
3D model (JSmol)	Interactive image; Na salt: Interactive image
ChEBI	CHEBI:71572
ChEMBL	ChEMBL4218391
ChemSpider	9775399
ECHA InfoCard	100.231.388
EC Number	804-698-5; Na salt: 804-287-0
KEGG	C22038
PubChem CID	11600642; Na salt: 23711819
UNII	4GF33A5PAJ
CompTox Dashboard (EPA)	DTXSID60469215
- InChI: InChI=1S/C9H10O5/c10-6-2-1-5(3-7(6)11)4-8(12)9(13)14/h1-3,8,10-12H,4H2,(H,13,14)/t8-/m1/s1 Key: PAFLSMZLRSPALU-MRVPVSSYSA-N; Na salt: InChI=1S/C9H10O5.Na/c10-6-2-1-5(3-7(6)11)4-8(12)9(13)14;/h1-3,8,10-12H,4H2,(H,13,14);/q;+1/p-1 Key: ZMMKVDBZTXUHFO-UHFFFAOYSA-M
- SMILES: C1=CC(=C(C=C1C[C@H](C(=O)O)O)O)O; Na salt: C1=CC(=C(C=C1CC(C(=O)[O-])O)O)O.[Na+]

Properties
Chemical formula	C_{9}H_{10}O_{5}
Molar mass	198.174 g·mol^{−1}
Melting point	84–86 °C (183–187 °F; 357–359 K)

Related compounds
Related compounds	Protocatechuic acid
- Except where otherwise noted, data are given for materials in their standard state (at 25 °C [77 °F], 100 kPa). Infobox references

Danshensu or salvianic acid A is an alpha hydroxy carboxylic acid. It is found in the plants Salvia miltiorrhiza, and Melissa officinalis. It is a component of some traditional Chinese medicine.

It was discovered in the water soluble extract of roots of Salvia miltiorrhiza. The substance can dissolve in water, methanol, ethanol, ethyl acetate and acetone. In practice the roots are extracted with boiling water. Then ethanol is added to bring the concentration up to %70 ethanol. This causes precipitation of protein, starch and polysaccharides. Chloroform then extracts coloured chemicals from the alcoholic solution.

Danshensu as a racemic form has been made from protocatechuic aldehyde.

== Reactions ==
Danshensu is sensitive to air or alkaline conditions. It oxidises, polymerises and darkens on exposure.

Danshensu can have its hydroxy groups methylated on treatment with dimethylsulfate. In acid conditions it can convert to salvianolic acid C.

== Pharmacology ==
Danshensu dilates cardiac arteries.

It can be sold as a sodium salt.

== See also ==
- Salvianolic acids, chemical derivatives of danshensu

== Extra reading ==
- Yan, Xijun (27 October 2014). Dan Shen (Salvia miltiorrhiza) in Medicine: Volume 2. Pharmacology and Quality Control. Springer. ISBN 978-94-017-9463-3.
