= CYP76 family =

Group of cytochrome P450 enzymes

Cytochrome P450, family 76, also known as CYP76, is a cytochrome P450 family in land plants, related to the biosynthesis of many plant monoterpenes and diterpenes such as 8-hydroxygeraniol, tanshinone and alkannin. The first gene identified in this family is the CYP76A1 and CYP76A2 from the eggplant.
