= Processing (Chinese materia medica) =

Processing (simplified Chinese: 炮制; traditional Chinese: 炮製; pinyin: páozhì, or Chinese: 炮炙; pinyin: páozhì) in Chinese materia medica (Chinese herbology) is the technique of altering the properties, sterilizing and removing poisons of crude medicines by processing using heat and combination with various materials in a kind of alchemical approach to preparation. It lacks scientific evidence and hence is considered as pseudoscientific.

== Methods ==
Pao Zhi processing may involve such means as washing, soaking, boiling, steaming, fermenting, drying, roasting, honey frying, wine frying, earth frying, vinegar frying, calcining, or other means. This is a kind of alchemical processing used in everyday preparation of herbal, mineral and animal medicinals.

There are also more esoteric traditions of processing, including those involving mercury, but the term is used to refer to the more common preparations. For instance, frying with wine is believed to enhance the circulatory properties of herbs. Frying with salt is believed to draw the herbal actions to the kidneys. Otherwise cooling herbs may be warmed up by heated techniques.

== See also ==
- Langgan
- List of traditional Chinese medicines
- Traditional Chinese medicines derived from the human body
