= Qiliqiangxin =

Traditional Chinese medicine formulation

Qiliqiangxin (QLQX, Chinese: 芪苈强心; pinyin: qí lì qiáng xīn) is a traditional Chinese medicine formulation used for the treatment of chronic heart failure. It was approved by the Chinese Food and Drug Administration in 2004 and included in the Chinese guidelines for the management of heart failure in 2014.

== Composition ==
Qiliqiangxin consists of a standardized extract derived from eleven medicinal herbs commonly used in traditional Chinese medicine (TCM), including:

- Panax ginseng (ginseng)
- Astragalus mongholicus (Mongolian milkvetch)
- Aconitum carmichaelii (Chinese aconite root)
- Salvia miltiorrhiza (red sage)
- Descurainia sophia (flixweed)
- Periploca sepium (Chinese silkvine root bark)
- Alisma plantago-aquatica subsp. orientale (Oriental waterplantain)
- Carthamus tinctorius (safflower)
- Polygonatum odoratum (Angular Solomon's seal)
- Citrus reticulata (dried mandarin peel)
- Cinnamomum cassia (cinnamon twig)

Identified bioactive compounds include astragaloside IV, tanshinone IIA, ginsenosides (Rb1, Rg1, Re), periplocymarin, and nobiletin. These components are associated with various pharmacological properties, including positive inotropic effects, vasodilation, and anti-inflammatory and antifibrotic activity.

=== Traditional medicine perspective ===
In traditional Chinese medicine, chronic heart failure is associated with a deficiency of heart qi and yang, often resulting in symptoms attributed to blood stasis, phlegm accumulation, and impaired fluid transport. Qiliqiangxin is formulated to replenish heart qi, yang, activate blood circulation, and resolve phlegm according to TCM theory.

== Administration ==
Qiliqiangxin is administered orally in the form of capsules or placebo. In clinical use, including the QUEST trial, the standard dosage consisted of 0.3 g capsules taken as four capsules three times daily (a total daily dose of 3.6 g). The capsules were administered alongside standard guideline-directed therapy for chronic heart failure. Dose adjustments, such as reducing to two or three capsules three times daily, or temporary discontinuation, were permitted in response to adverse events.

In preclinical studies, the administration methods varied according to the model organism. In rat models of myocardial infarction, qiliqiangxin was administered at a dose of 1.0 g/kg/day, dissolved in sterile water and given by oral gavage for four weeks. In mouse studies, intragastric administration was employed, with doses ranging from 0.25 to 0.75 g/kg/day. A dose of 0.5 g/kg/day was used in most subsequent mouse experiments, as it was considered pharmacologically equivalent to clinical dosing in humans.
