= C26H25ClN2O3 =

The molecular formula C_{26}H_{25}ClN_{2}O_{3} (molar mass: 448.941 g/mol) may refer to:

- Lirequinil (Ro41-3696)
- Tolvaptan
