= Red Sage =

Red sage may refer to:

- Salvia miltiorrhiza, a plant used in traditional Chinese Medicine
- Lantana camara, also known as Spanish Flag, a species of flowering plant
- Red Sage, a character in the Jak and Daxter video game series
