= Salvianolic acids =

- Salvianolic acids A-D

Identifiers
CAS Number	A: 96574-01-5; B: 121521-90-2; C: 115841-09-3; D: 142998-47-8
3D model (JSmol)	A: Interactive image; B: Interactive image; C: Interactive image; D: Interactive image
ChEBI	A: CHEBI:9017; B: CHEBI:134301; C: CHEBI:140104; D: CHEBI:177612
ChEMBL	A: ChEMBL457077; B: ChEMBL1615434; C: ChEMBL4077922
ChemSpider	A: 4445105
DrugBank	A: DB15246
KEGG	A: C10492
PubChem CID	A: 5281793; B: 6451084; C: 13991590; D: 75412558
UNII	B: C1GQ844199; C: I16H9Z53ZL; D: 28R85321EY
CompTox Dashboard (EPA)	A: DTXSID701316580; B: DTXSID201031347; C: DTXSID101341785; D: DTXSID801341786
- InChI: A: InChI=1S/C26H22O10/c27-18-7-2-14(11-21(18)30)1-6-17-16(4-9-20(29)25(17)33)5-10-24(32)36-23(26(34)35)13-15-3-8-19(28)22(31)12-15/h1-12,23,27-31,33H,13H2,(H,34,35)/b6-1+,10-5+/t23-/m1/s1 Key: YMGFTDKNIWPMGF-UCPJVGPRSA-N; B: InChI=1S/C36H30O16/c37-20-6-1-16(11-24(20)41)13-27(34(45)46)50-29(44)10-5-18-3-9-23(40)33-30(18)31(32(52-33)19-4-8-22(39)26(43)15-19)36(49)51-28(35(47)48)14-17-2-7-21(38)25(42)12-17/h1-12,15,27-28,31-32,37-43H,13-14H2,(H,45,46)(H,47,48)/b10-5+/t27-,28-,31+,32-/m1/s1 Key: SNKFFCBZYFGCQN-VWUOOIFGSA-N; C: InChI=1S/C26H20O10/c27-17-5-1-13(9-20(17)30)10-23(26(33)34)35-24(32)8-4-14-2-7-19(29)25-16(14)12-22(36-25)15-3-6-18(28)21(31)11-15/h1-9,11-12,23,27-31H,10H2,(H,33,34)/b8-4+/t23-/m1/s1 Key: GCJWPRRNLSHTRY-VURDRKPISA-N; D: InChI=1S/C20H18O10/c21-13-4-1-10(7-15(13)23)8-16(20(28)29)30-18(26)6-3-11-2-5-14(22)19(27)12(11)9-17(24)25/h1-7,16,21-23,27H,8-9H2,(H,24,25)(H,28,29)/b6-3+/t16-/m1/s1 Key: KFCMFABBVSIHTB-WUTVXBCWSA-N
- SMILES: A: C1=CC(=C(C=C1C[C@H](C(=O)O)OC(=O)/C=C/C2=C(C(=C(C=C2)O)O)/C=C/C3=CC(=C(C=C3)O)O)O)O; B: C1=CC(=C(C=C1C[C@H](C(=O)O)OC(=O)/C=C/C2=C3[C@@H]([C@H](OC3=C(C=C2)O)C4=CC(=C(C=C4)O)O)C(=O)O[C@H](CC5=CC(=C(C=C5)O)O)C(=O)O)O)O; C: C1=CC(=C(C=C1C[C@H](C(=O)O)OC(=O)/C=C/C2=C3C=C(OC3=C(C=C2)O)C4=CC(=C(C=C4)O)O)O)O; D: C1=CC(=C(C=C1C[C@H](C(=O)O)OC(=O)/C=C/C2=C(C(=C(C=C2)O)O)CC(=O)O)O)O
- Except where otherwise noted, data are given for materials in their standard state (at 25 °C [77 °F], 100 kPa). Infobox references

Salvianolic acids are a group of polyphenolic acids consisting of several combinations of caffeic acid and danshensu (salvianic acid) through ester and enol bonds. Salvianolic acids are water-soluble components produced by many species of the genus Salvia, mainly extracted from Salvia miltiorrhiza.

== Structural properties ==
More than 10 distinct salvianolic acids (Sal), identified by letters from A to J, have been recognized. Notably, Sal-A and Sal-B are the most abundant forms. The combination of danshensu and a caffeic acid derivative or caffeic acid dimer produces several kinds of skeletons. Sal-A is formed by a molecule of danshensu and a dimer of caffeic acid. Sal-B, on the other hand, is constituted by three molecules of danshensu and one molecule of caffeic acid. Sal-C results from the combination of two molecules of danshensu, while Sal-D is characterized as a dimer of caffeic acid.

== Biosynthesis and natural occurrence ==
The formation of salvianolic acids is closely linked to that of rosmarinic acid. They are primarily synthesized through the phenylpropanoid and tyrosine-derived branches of the phenolic acid biosynthetic pathway. Rosmarinic acid undergoes a not well-understood oxidative reaction to convert into Salvianolic acid B. This reaction involves laccases, which are widely spread in many genera such as Arabidopsis, poplars, sorghum, etc., but appears to be highly expressed in Salvia miltiorrhiza and Salvia bowleyana.
