= Miltirone =

Clinical data
- Other names: Rosmariquinone
- Routes of administration: Oral
- Drug class: GABA_{A} receptor positive allosteric modulator; Anxiolytic
- ATC code: None

Identifiers
- IUPAC name: 8,8-dimethyl-2-propan-2-yl-6,7-dihydro-5H-phenanthrene-3,4-dione
- CAS Number: 27210-57-7
- PubChem CID: 160142
- ChemSpider: 140765
- KEGG: C13715
- ChEBI: CHEBI:34851
- ChEMBL: ChEMBL45830
- CompTox Dashboard (EPA): DTXSID20181683

Chemical and physical data
- Formula: C_{19}H_{22}O_{2}
- Molar mass: 282.383 g·mol^{−1}
- 3D model (JSmol): Interactive image
- SMILES: CC(C)C1=CC2=C(C3=C(C=C2)C(CCC3)(C)C)C(=O)C1=O
- InChI: InChI=1S/C19H22O2/c1-11(2)14-10-12-7-8-15-13(6-5-9-19(15,3)4)16(12)18(21)17(14)20/h7-8,10-11H,5-6,9H2,1-4H3; Key:FEFAIBOZOKSLJR-UHFFFAOYSA-N

Miltirone, also known as rosmariquinone, is an alkaloid found in plants such as Salvia rosmarinus (rosemary) and Salvia miltiorrhiza (danshen, red sage, or Chinese sage). It is a diterpene quinone, a group of compounds that are also known as tanshinones.

== Pharmacology ==
The drug is a nonbenzodiazepine GABA_{A} receptor positive allosteric modulator, binding to the benzodiazepine allosteric site of the receptor complex with a relatively low affinity (IC_{50}) of 300 nM and acting as a partial agonist. It was orally active in animals and produced anxiolytic-like effects, but in contrast to diazepam, did not produce acute muscle relaxant effects and did not cause dependence or withdrawal with chronic administration. As a tanshinone, miltirone is structurally distinct from other known benzodiazepine receptor ligands.

== Development ==
Miltirone was first described in the scientific literature by 1970. It was isolated and described in red sage by 1970 and in rosemary by 1985. The GABA_{A} receptor potentiation of miltirone was described in 1991. The drug was under formal pharmaceutical development by Abbott Laboratories for the treatment of anxiety disorders, but development was discontinued.

Synthetic analogues of miltirone with greater potency as GABA_{A} receptor positive allosteric modulators (e.g., affinity (IC_{50} = 50 nM or improved by 6-fold) have been developed and reported.

== See also ==
- Lirequinil
