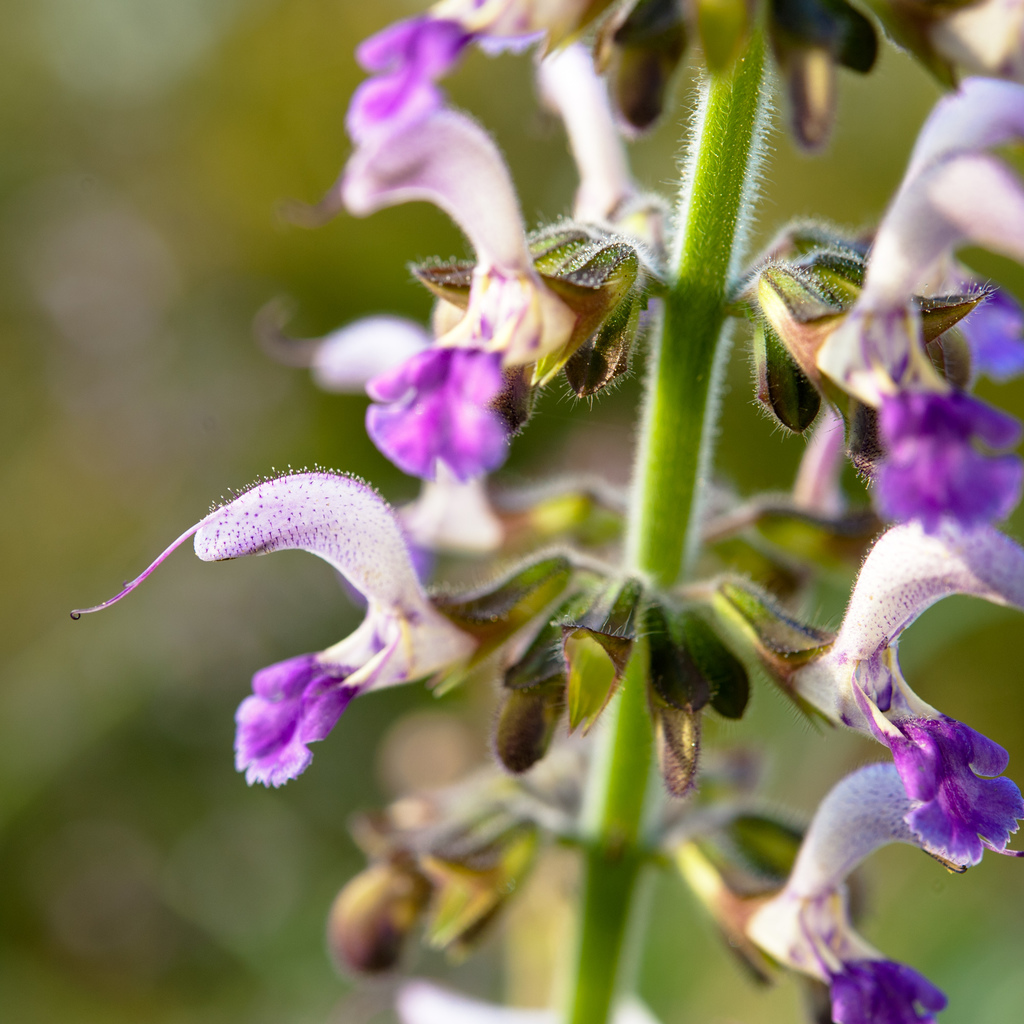

Scientific classification
- Kingdom: Plantae
- Clade: Tracheophytes
- Clade: Angiosperms
- Clade: Eudicots
- Clade: Asterids
- Order: Lamiales
- Family: Lamiaceae
- Genus: Salvia
- Species: S. bowleyana

Binomial name
- Salvia bowleyana Dunn

= Salvia bowleyana =

Species of plant

Salvia bowleyana (southern danshen; in Chinese: nan dan shen) is a perennial plant native to China, south of the Yangtze River, growing on hillsides, beside streams, in forests, and in valleys between 30 and 9,600 metres (98 and 31,496 ft) elevation. It is used medicinally in China in the same way as Salvia miltiorrhiza and is often confused with it. Salvia miltiorrhiza's common name is "dan shen", while S. bowleyana's is "nan dan shen", which means "southern dan shen".

Salvia bowleyana grows up to 1 metre (3.3 ft) tall, with flowers that are purple to purple-blue.
