= Lirequinil =

Chemical compound

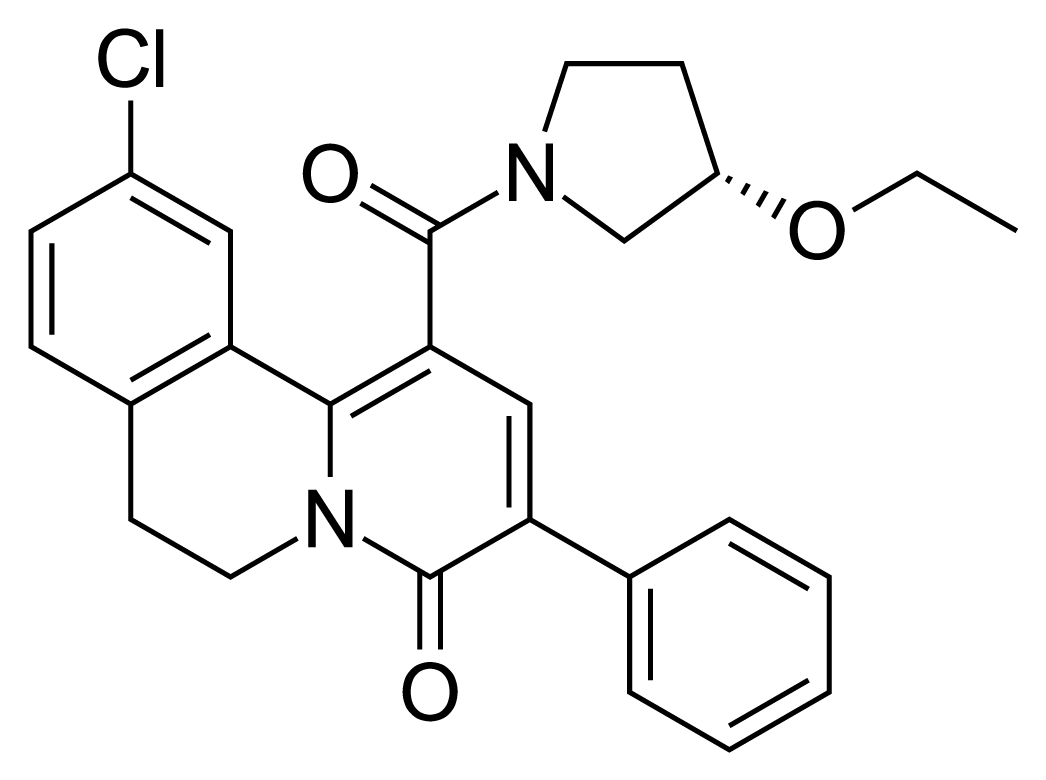

Clinical data
- Other names: Ro 41-3696; Ro41-3696; RO-413696; RO413696
- Routes of administration: Oral
- ATC code: None

Identifiers
- IUPAC name: 10-chloro-1-[(3S)-3-ethoxypyrrolidine-1-carbonyl]-3-phenyl-6,7-dihydrobenzo[a]quinolizin-4-one
- CAS Number: 143943-73-1
- PubChem CID: 3045375
- ChemSpider: 2308119
- UNII: 2VUW1087AD
- ChEMBL: ChEMBL2105118
- CompTox Dashboard (EPA): DTXSID80162579

Chemical and physical data
- Formula: C_{26}H_{25}ClN_{2}O_{3}
- Molar mass: 448.95 g·mol^{−1}
- 3D model (JSmol): Interactive image
- SMILES: CCO[C@H]1CCN(C1)C(=O)C2=C3C4=C(CCN3C(=O)C(=C2)C5=CC=CC=C5)C=CC(=C4)Cl
- InChI: InChI=1S/C26H25ClN2O3/c1-2-32-20-11-12-28(16-20)25(30)23-15-22(17-6-4-3-5-7-17)26(31)29-13-10-18-8-9-19(27)14-21(18)24(23)29/h3-9,14-15,20H,2,10-13,16H2,1H3/t20-/m0/s1; Key:CBSWRAUYCIIUEI-FQEVSTJZSA-N

Lirequinil (development code Ro 41-3696) is a nonbenzodiazepine hypnotic drug which binds to benzodiazepine sites on the GABA_{A} receptor. In human clinical trials, lirequinil was found to have similar efficacy to zolpidem, with less side effects such as clumsiness and memory impairment. However it was also much slower acting than zolpidem, with peak plasma concentrations not reached until 2.5 hours after oral administration, and its O-desethyl metabolite Ro41-3290 is also active with a half-life of 8 hours. This meant that while effective as a hypnotic, lirequinil failed to prove superior to zolpidem due to producing more next-day sedation, and it has not been adopted for clinical use. It was developed by a team at Hoffmann-La Roche in the 1990s.

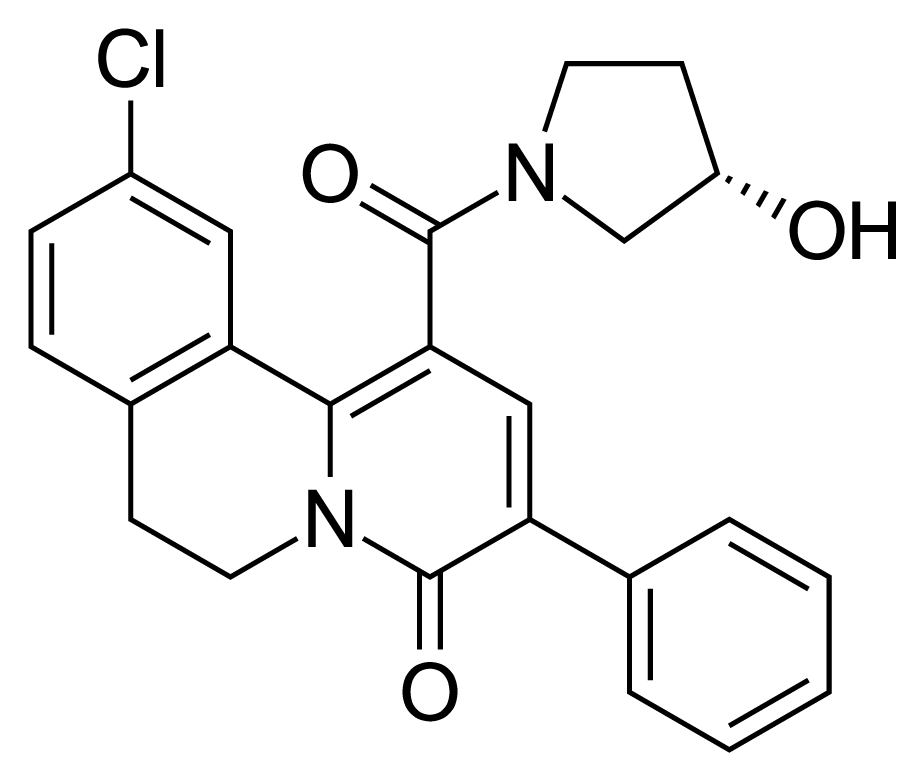
Active metabolite Ro41-3290

== See also ==
- List of investigational insomnia drugs
- Miltirone (rosmariquinone)
- SL651498
