= Langgan =

Ancient Chinese name of an unknown mineral

- Seal script for langgan 琅玕

Chinese name
- Chinese: 琅玕
Transcriptions
Standard Mandarin
- Hanyu Pinyin: lánggān
- Bopomofo: ㄌㄤˊㄍㄢ
- Gwoyeu Romatzyh: langgan
- Wade–Giles: lang-kan
- IPA: /lɑŋ³⁵ka̠n⁵⁵/
Yue: Cantonese
- Jyutping: long^{4}gon^{1}
Southern Min
- Hokkien POJ: longkan
Middle Chinese
- Middle Chinese: lɑŋkan
Old Chinese
- Baxter–Sagart (2014): [r]ˤaŋkˁar

Korean name
- Hangul: 랑간
- Hanja: 琅玕
Transcriptions
- Revised Romanization: ranggan
- McCune–Reischauer: ranggan

Japanese name
- Kanji: 琅玕
- Hiragana: ろうかん
Transcriptions
- Revised Hepburn: rōkan

Langgan (Chinese: 琅玕; pinyin: lánggān) is the ancient Chinese name of a gemstone which remains an enigma in the history of mineralogy; it has been identified, variously, as blue-green malachite, blue coral, white coral, whitish chalcedony, red spinel, and red jade. It is also the name of a mythological langgan tree of immortality found in the western paradise of Kunlun Mountain, and the name of the classic waidan alchemical elixir of immortality 琅玕華丹; langgan huadan; "Elixir Efflorescence of Langgan".

== Word ==
The Chinese characters 琅 and 玕 used to write the gemstone name lánggān are classified as radical-phonetic characters that combine the semantically significant "jade radical" 玉 or 王 (commonly used to write names of jades or gemstones) and phonetic elements hinting at pronunciation. 琅; Láng combines the "jade radical" with 良; liáng; "good; fine" (interpreted to denote "fine jade") and 玕; gān combines it with the phonetic 干; gān; "stem; trunk". The Chinese word 玉; yù is usually translated as "jade" but in some contexts translates as "fine ornamental stone; gemstone; precious stone", and can refer to a variety of rocks that carve and polish well, including jadeite, nephrite, agalmatolite, bowenite, and serpentine.

Modern written Chinese 琅; láng and 玕; gān have variant Chinese characters. 琅; Láng is occasionally transcribed as 瑯; láng (with 郞; láng; "gentleman") or 瓓; lán (闌; lán; "railing"); and 玕; gān is rarely written as 玵; gān (with a 甘; gān; "sweet" phonetic). Guwen "ancient script" variants were 𤨜; láng or 𤦴 and 𤥚; gān.

Berthold Laufer proposed that langgan was an onomatopoetic word "descriptive of the sound yielded by the sonorous stone when struck". Lang occurs in several imitative words meaning "tinkling of jade pendants/ornaments": 琅琅; lángláng; "tinkling/jingling sound", 玲琅; língláng; "tinkling/jangling of jade", 琳琅; línláng; "beautiful jade; sound of jade", and 琅璫; lángdāng; "tinkling sound". Laufer further suggests this etymology would explain the transference of the name langgan from a stone to a coral; Du Wan's 杜綰 c. 1125 Yunlin shipu (雲林石譜; "Stone Catalogue of the Cloudy Forest") (below) expressly states that the coral langgan "when struck develops resonant properties".

== Classical descriptions ==
The name langgan has undergone remarkable semantic change. The first references to langgan are found in Chinese classics from the Warring States period (475-221 BCE) and Han dynasty (206 BCE-220 CE), which describe it as a valuable gemstone and mineral drug, as well as the mythological fruit of the langgan tree of immortality on Kunlun Mountain. Texts from the turbulent Six Dynasties period (220-589) and Sui dynasty (581-618) used langgan gemstone as a literary metaphor, and an ingredient in alchemical elixirs of immortality, many of which were poisonous. During the Tang dynasty (618-907), langgan was reinterpreted as a type of coral.

Several early texts (including the Shujing, Guanzi, and Erya below) recorded langgan in context with the obscure gemstone(s) 璆琳; qiúlín. In Classical Chinese syntax, 璆琳 can be parsed as two qiu and lin types of jade or as one qiulin type. A recent dictionary of Classical Chinese says 璆 (qiú; "fine jade, jade lithophone") is cognate with 球 (qiú; "precious gem, fine jade; jade chime or lithophone (which later came to mean "ball; sphere")"), and 琳 (lín; "blue-gem; sapphire").

In what may be the earliest record, the c. 5th-3rd centuries BCE Yu Gong "Tribute of Yu the Great" chapter of the Shujing "Classic of Documents" says the tributary products from Yong Province (located in the Wei River plain, one of the ancient Nine Provinces) included qiulin and langgan jade-like gemstones: "Its articles of tribute were the k'ew and lin gem-stones, and the lang-kan precious stones". Legge quotes Kong Anguo's commentary that langgan is "a stone, but like a pearl", and suggests it was possibly lazulite or lapis lazuli, which Laufer calls "purely conjectural".

The c. 4th-3rd centuries BCE Guanzi encyclopedic text, named for and attributed to the 7th century BCE philosopher Guan Zhong, who served as Prime Minister to Duke Huan of Qi (r. 685-643 BCE), uses 璧 (bi; "a flat jade disc with a hole in the center"), 璆琳 (qiulin; "lapis lazuli"), and 琅玕 (langgan) as examples of how establishing diverse local commodities as fiat currencies will encourage foreign economic cooperation. When Duke Huan asks Guanzi about how to politically control the "Four Yi" (meaning "all foreigners" on China's borders), he replies:

Since the Yuzhi [i.e., Yuezhi/Kushans in Central Asia] have not paid court, I request our use of white jade discs [白璧] as money. Since those in the Kunlun desert (modern-day Xinjiang and Tibet) have not paid court, I request our use of lapis lazuli and langgan gems as money. … Since a white jade held tight unseen against one's chest or under one's armpit will be used as a thousand pieces of gold, we can obtain the Yuezhi eight thousand li away and make them pay court. Since a lapis lazuli and langgan gem (fashioned in) a hair clasp and earring will be used as a thousand gold pieces, we can obtain [i.e., defeat] [the inhabitants] of the Kunlun deserts eight thousand li away and make them pay court. Therefore if resources are not commandeered, economies will not connect, those distant from each other will have nothing to use for their common interest and the four yi will not be obtained and come to court.

Xun Kuang's 3rd century BCE Confucian classic Xunzi has a context criticizing elaborate burials that uses 丹矸; dan'gan (with 丹; dān; "cinnabar" and 矸; gān; "waste rock", with the "stone radical" and same 干; gān phonetic) and 琅玕; langgan.

In these ancient times, the body was covered with pearls and jades, the inner coffin was filled with beautifully ornamented embroideries, and he outer coffin was filled with yellow gold and decorated with cinnabar [丹矸] with added layers of laminar verdite. [In the outer tomb chamber were] rhinoceros and elephant ivory fashioned into trees, with precious rubies [琅玕], magnetite lodestones, and flowering aconite for their fruit." (18.7)

John Knoblock translates langgan as "rubies", noting perhaps the genuine ruby or balas spinel, were connected with the cult of immortality, and cites the Shanhaijing saying they grow on Mount Kunlun's Fuchang trees, and the Zhen'gao saying that adepts swallow "ruby blossoms" to feign death and become transcendents.

Early Chinese dictionaries define langgan. The c. 4th-3rd century BCE Erya geography section (9 Shidi 釋地) lists valuable products from the various regions of ancient China: "The beautiful things of the northwest are the qiulin [璆琳] and langgan gemstones from the wastelands [虛] of Kunlun Mountain". The 121 CE Shuowen jiezi (Jade Radical section 玉部) has two consecutive definitions for 琅; lang and 玕; gan. Lang is [used in] langgan, which "resembles a pearl [似珠者]", Gan is [used in] langgan, paraphrasing the Yu Gong, "Yong Province [using the ancient 雝; yōng character for 雍; yōng] [produces] qiulin and langgan [gems] [球琳琅玕]".

Three sections about western Chinese mountains in the c. 4th-2nd centuries BCE Shanhaijing "Classic of Mountains and Seas" record early geographic legends associating langgan with Xi Wang Mu "Queen Mother of the West" who lives on Jade Mountain in the mythological axis mundi Kunlun Mountain paradise. Two mention langgan gems and one mentions langganshu 琅玕樹 trees. The Shanhaijing translator Anne Birrell exemplifies the difficulties of translating the word langgan in three ways: "pearl-like gems", "red jade", and "precious gem [tree]".

First, the "Classic of the Mountains: West" section says Huaijiang 槐江 (lit. "pagoda-tree river") Mountain, located 400 li northeast of Kunlun Mountain, has abundant langgan and other valuable minerals. "On the summit of Mount Carobriver are quantities of green male-yellow [多青雄黃], precious pearl-like gems [藏琅玕], and yellow gold and jade. Granular cinnabar is abundant on its south face and there are quantities of speckled yellow gold and silver on its north face." (2) "Male-yellow" overliterally translates 雄黃; xiónghuáng; "realgar; red orpiment"—Compare Richard Strassberg's translation, "On the mountain’s heights is much green realgar, the finest quality of Langgan-Stone, yellow gold, and jade. On its southern slope are many grains of cinnabar, while on its northern slope are much glittering yellow gold and silver.". Guo Pu's 4th century CE Shanhaijing commentary says langgan 石; shi; "stone/gem" (cf. 子; zi; "seeds" in the third section) resembles a pearl, and 藏; cáng; "store; conceal, hide" means 隱; yǐn; "conceal; hide". However, Hao Yixing's 郝懿行 1822 commentary says 藏; cáng was originally written 臧; zāng; "good", that is, Huaijiang Mountain has the "best" quality langgan.

Second, the "Classic of the Great Wilderness: West" section records that on [Xi] Wang Mu 王母 "Queen Mother [of the West]" Mountain: "Here are the sweet-bloom tree, sweet quince, white weeping willow, the look-flesh creature, the triply-grey horse, precious jade [琁瑰], dark green jade gemstone [瑤碧], the white tree, red jade [琅玕], white cinnabar, green cinnabar, and quantities of silver and iron." (16)

Third, the "Classic of Regions Within the Seas: West" section refers to a mythical tricephalic creature dwelling in a fuchangshu (服常樹; 'serve constant tree') who guards a langganshu tree south of Kunlun: "The wears-ever fruit tree—on its crown there is a three-headed person who is in charge of the precious gem tree [琅玕樹]." (11) Interpreters disagree whether the langgan tree grows alongside the fuchang tree or grows on it. Guo Pu's commentary admits unfamiliarity with the 服常; fuchang tree; Wu Renchen's 17th-century commentary notes the similarity with the 沙棠; shachang; "sand-plum tree" that the Huainanzi lists with langgan, but doubts they are the same. Guo's commentary says langgan zi 子 "seeds" or "fruits" resemble pearls (cf. the Shuowen definition) and quotes the Erya that it is found on Kunlun Mountain.

The c. 120 BCE Huainanzi "Terrestrial Forms" chapter (4 墬形) describes langgan trees and langgan jade both found on Mt. Kunlun. The first context describes how Yu the Great controlled the Great Flood and "excavated the wastelands of Kunlun [昆侖之球] to make level ground". "Atop the heights of Kunlun are treelike cereal plants [木禾] thirty-five feet tall. Growing to the west of these are pearl trees [珠樹], jade trees [玉樹], carnelian trees [琁樹], and no-death trees [不死樹]. To the east are found sand-plum trees [沙棠] and malachite trees [琅玕]. To the south are crimson trees [絳樹]. To the north are bi jade trees [碧樹] and yao jade trees [瑤樹]." (4.3), translating with Schafer's "malachite" instead of "coral"). The second context paraphrases the Erya definition (above) of langgan: "The beautiful things of the northwest are the qiu, lin, and langgan jades [球琳琅玕] of the Kunlun Mountains [昆侖]" (4.7), noting that qiu, lin, and langgan are "types of jade, mostly not identifiable with certainty".

== Medicine ==
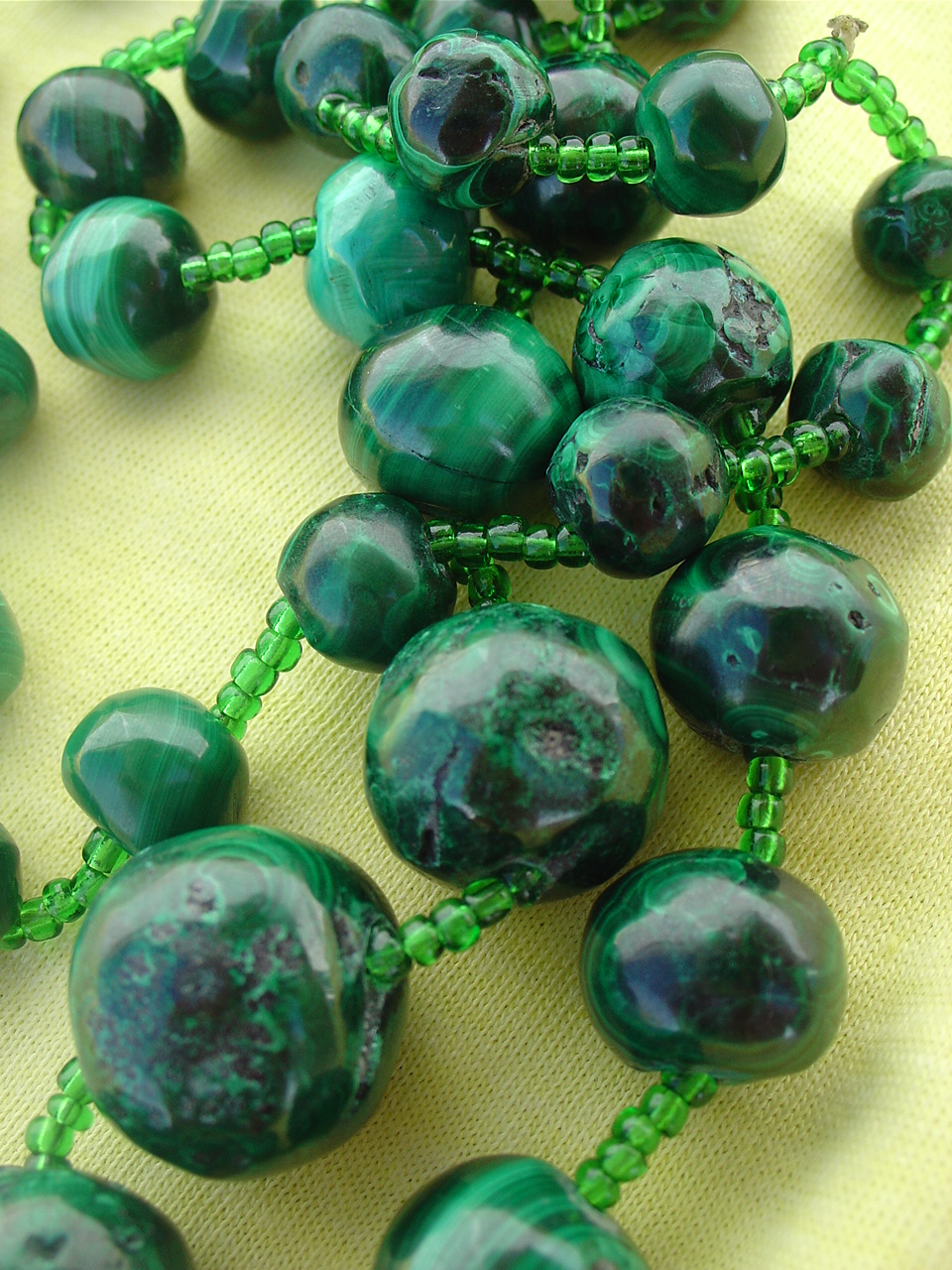
Malachite bead necklace

Several early classics of traditional Chinese medicine mention langgan.

The c. 1st century BCE Huangdi Neijing's Suwen 素問 "Basic Questions" section uses langgan beads to describe a healthy pulse. "When man is serene and healthy the pulse of the heart flows and connects, just as pearls are joined together or like a string of red jade [如循琅玕]—then one can speak of a healthy heart".

The c. 2nd century CE Nan Jing explains this langgan bead simile: "[If the qi in] the vessels comes tied together like rings, or as if they were following [in their movement a chain of] lang gan stones [如循琅玕], that implies a normal state." Commentaries elaborate that langgan stones "resemble pearls" and their movement is like a "string of jade- or pearl-like beads".

The c. 3rd century CE Shennong Bencaojing lists qīng lánggān (青琅玕; "blue-green langgan") or shízhū (石珠; 'rock pearl') as a mineral drug used to treat ailments such as itchy skin, carbuncle, and ALS. This is one of the rare early references to langgan that treats it as a real substance, while many others make it a feature of the divine world.

== Alchemy ==
The langgan huadan (琅玕華丹; "Elixir Efflorescence of Langgan") name of the waidan "external alchemy" elixir of immortality is the best-known usage of the word langgan. Some other translations are "Elixir of Langgan Efflorescence", "Lang-Kan (Gem) Radiant Elixir", and "Elixir Flower of Langgan".

The earliest method of compounding the elixir is found in the Taiwei lingshu ziwen langgan huadan shenzhen shangjing (太微靈書紫文琅玕華丹神真上經; "Supreme Scripture on the Elixir of Langgan Efflorescence, from the Purple Texts Inscribed by the Spirits of Grand Tenuity"). This text was originally part of the Daoist Shangqing School scriptural corpus supposedly revealed to Yang Xi (330-c. 386 CE) between 364 and 370.

The Purple Texts alchemical recipe for preparing Elixir of Langgan Efflorescence involves nine steps in four stages carried out over thirteen years. The first stage produces the Langgan Efflorescence proper, which when ingested is said to make "one's complexion similar to gold and jade and enables one to summon divine beings". The next three stages further refine and transform the Langgan Elixir, repeatedly plant it in the earth, and eventually generate a tree whose fruits confer immortality when eaten, just like those of the legendary langgan tree on Mount Kunlun. Upon completing any of the nine successive steps in producing the elixir, the alchemist (or adept in the neidan interpretation) can choose to either ingest the products and obtain immortality by ascending into the realm of Shangqing heavens or may continue on to the next step with the promise of ever-increasing rewards.

The first stage has one complex waidan step of compounding the primary Langgan Efflorescence. After performing ritual zhāi (齋; "purification practices") for 40 days, the adept spends 60 days to acquire and prepared the elixir's fourteen ingredients, place them in a crucible, add mercury on top of them, lute the crucible with several layers of mud, and after sacrificing wine to the divinities, heating the crucible for 100 days. The elixir's fourteen reagents, given in exalted code names such as "White-Silk Flying Dragon" for quartz, are: cinnabar, realgar, milky quartz, azurite, amethyst, graphite, saltpeter, sulfur, asbestos, mica, iron pyrite, lead carbonate, Turkestan salt (desert lake precipitates containing gypsum, anhydrite, and halite), and orpiment. Based upon these ingredients, Schafer says the end product was probably bluish flint glass with a high lead content. The alchemist can either leave the crucible closed and proceed to the next stage or break it open and consume the langan elixir that is said to yield marvelous results.

The efflorescence should have thirty-seven hues. It is a volatile liquid both brilliant and mottled, a purple aurora darkly flashing. This is called the Elixir of Langgan Efflorescence. If, just at dawn on the first day of the eleventh, fourth, or eighth month, you bow repeatedly and ingest one ounce of this elixir with the water from an east-flowing stream, seven-colored pneumas will rise from your head and your face will have the jadelike glow of metallic efflorescence. If you hold your breath, immediately a chariot from the eight shrouded extents of the universe will arrive. When you spit on the ground, your saliva will transform into a flying dragon. When you whistle to your left, divine Transcendents will pay court to you; when you point to the right, the vapors of Three Elementals will join with the wind. Then, in thousands of conveyances, with myriad outriders, you will fly up to Upper Clarity.

The second stage comprises two iterative 100-day waidan alchemical steps transforming the elixir. Firing the unopened stage one crucible of Langgan Efflorescence for another 100 days will produce the Lunar Efflorescence of the Yellow Solution [黄水月華], which when consumed will make you "change forms ten thousand times, your eyes will become luminous moons, and you will float above in the Grand Void to fly off to the Palace of Purple Tenuity". The next step of firing the closed crucible for an additional one 100 days will produce three giant pearls called the Jade Essence of the Swirling Solution [徊水玉精]. Ingesting one alchemical pearl supposedly causes you to immediately give off liquid and fire, form gems with your breath, and your body "will become a sun, and the Thearchs of Heaven will descend to greet you. You will rise as a glowing orb to Upper Clarity."

The third stage involves four 3-year steps utilizing the elixirs produced in the first two stages to create fantastic seeds that are replanted and grow into increasingly perfected "spirit trees" with fruits of immortality. This stage falls between conventional waidan alchemy and the horticultural art of growing marvelous zhi (芝; "plants of longevity; fungi") such as the lingzhi mushroom. Initially, the adept mixes the Elixir of Langgan Efflorescence with Jade Essence of the Swirling Solution, transforming the jīng (精; "essence; sperm; seed") in the latter name into an actual seed that is planted in an irrigated field. After three years it grows into the Tree of Ringed Adamant [環剛樹子] or Hidden Polypore of the Grand Bourne [太極隱芝], which has a ring-shaped fruit like a red jujube. Next, the adept plants one of the ringed fruits and waters it with the Yellow Solution, and after three years a plant called the Phoenix-Brain Polypore [鳳腦芝; fengnao zhi] will grow like a calabash, with pits like five-colored peaches. Then, a phoenix-brain fruit is planted and watered with Yellow Solution, which after three years will grow into a red tree, like a pine, five or six feet in height, with a jade-white fruit like a pear [赤樹白子]. Lastly, the adept plants the seed of the red tree, waters it with Swirling Solution, waits another three years for the growth of a vermilion tree like a plum, six or seven feet in height, with a halycon-blue fruit like the jujube [絳樹青實]. Upon eating this fruit, the adept will ascend to the heaven of Purple Tenuity.

The fourth stage involves two comparatively quicker waidan steps. The adept repeatedly boils equal parts of the Yellow Solution and the Swirling Solution, and transforms them into the Blue Florets of Aqueous Yang [水陽青映]. If you drink this at dawn, your body will issue a blue and gemmy light, your mouth will spew forth purple vapors, and you will rise above to Upper Clarity [Shangqing]. But before departing earth, the adept's last step is to mix the remaining Elixir of Langan Efflorescence with liquified lead and mercury to produce 50-pound ingots of alchemical silver and purple gold, make incantations to the water spirits, and throw both oblatory ingots into a stream.

Despite the carefully detailed Purple Texts' waidan recipe for preparing langgan elixirs, scholars have doubted that the authors actually meant for it to be produced and consumed. Some interpret the impractical 13-year elixir recipe as symbolic instructions for what later came to be known as neidan meditative visualization, and is more a "product of religious imagination", drawing on the respected metaphors of alchemical language, than a laboratory manual drawing on the metaphors of meditation. Others believe this "extravagantly impractical recipe" is an attempt to assimilate into conventional waidan alchemy the ancient legends about langgan gems that grow on trees in the paradise of KunIun.

The Shangqing Daoist patriarch Tao Hongjing compiled and edited both the c. 370 Taiwei lingshu ziwen langgan huadan shenzhen shangjing and the c. 499 真誥; Zhen'gao; "Declarations of the Perfected" that also mentions langan elixirs in some of the same terminology. One context records that the early Daoist masters Yan Menzi 衍門子, Gao Qiuzi 高丘子, and Master Hongyai 洪涯先生 swallowed langgan hua (琅玕華; "langgan blossoms") to feign death and become xian transcendents and enter the "dark region" beyond the world. Needham and Lu proposed this langgan hua probably refers to a red or green poisonous mushroom, and Knoblock surmised that these "ruby blossoms" were a species of hallucinogenic mushroom connected with the elixir of immortality. Another Zhen'gao context describes how in the Shangqing latter days before the apocalypse (predicted to be in 507) people will practice alchemy to create immortality drugs, including the Langgan Elixir that "will flow and flower in thick billows" and Cloud Langgan. If the adept takes one spatula full of elixir, "their spiritual feathers will spread forth like pinions. Then will they (be able to) peruse the pattern figured on the Vault of Space, and glow forth in the Chamber of Primal Commencement".

Several ingredients in the Elixir of Langgan Efflorescence are toxic heavy metals including mercury, lead, and arsenic, and alchemical elixir poisoning was common knowledge in China. Academics have puzzled over why Daoist adepts would knowingly consume a compound of mineral poisons, and Michel Strickmann, a scholar of Daoist and Buddhist studies, proposes that langgan elixir was believed to be an agent of self-liberation that guaranteed immortality to the faithful through a kind of ritual suicide. Since early Daoist literature thoroughly, "even rapturously", described the deadly toxic qualities of many elixirs, Strickmann concluded that scholars need to reexamine the Western stereotype of "accidental elixir poisoning" that supposedly applied to "misguided alchemists and their unwitting imperial patrons".

== Literature ==
Chinese authors extended the classical descriptions of langgan meaning "a highly valued gem from western China; a mythical tree of immortality on Kunlun Mountain" into a literary and poetic metaphor for the exotic beauties of an idealized natural world.

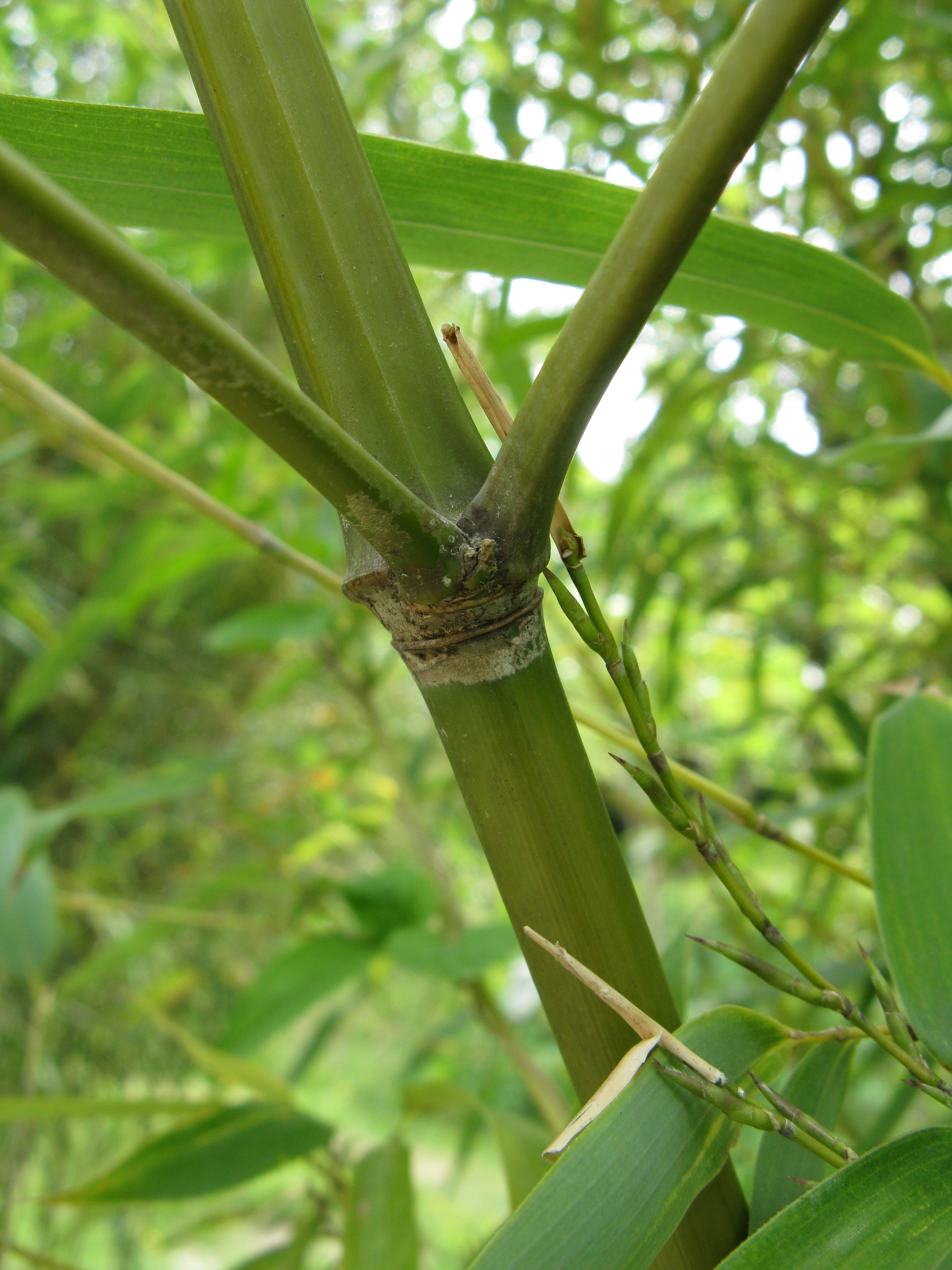
Spotted bamboo Phyllostachys bambusoides

Several early writers described langgan jewelry, both real and fictional. The 2nd-century scholar and scientist Zhang Heng described a party for the Han nobility at which guests were delighted with the presentation of bowls overflowing with zhēnxiū (珍羞; "delicacies; exotic foods") including langgan fruits of paradise. The 3rd-century poet Cao Zhi described hanging "halcyon blue" (翠; cuì) langgan from the waist of his "beautiful person", and the 5th-century poet Jiang Yan adorned a goddess with gems of langgan. Some other authors reinforced use of its name to refer to divine fruits on heavenly trees. Ruan Ji, one of the Seven Sages of the Bamboo Grove, wrote a 3rd-century poem titled "Dining at Sunrise on Langgan Fruit". The 8th-century poet Li Bai wrote about a famished but proud fenghuang that would not deign to peck at bird food, but like a Daoist adept, would scorn all but a diet of langgan. This represents a literary transition from glittering fruit of distant Kunlun, to aristocratic fare in golden bowls, eventually to an elixir of immortality.

A further extension of the langgan metaphor was to describe natural images of beautiful crystals and lush vegetation. For example, Ban Zhao's poem on "The Arrival of Winter" says, "The long [Yellow River] forms (crystalline) langgan [written 瓓玕; langan] / Layered ice is like banked-up jade". Two of Du Fu's poems figuratively used the word langgan in reference to the vegetation around the forest home of a Daoist recluse, and to the splendid grass that provided seating for guests at a royal picnic near a mysterious grotto. Bamboo was the most typical representative of blue-green langgan in the plant world, compare 筤; láng; "bamboo radical" and the liáng phonetic in 琅; láng; "young bamboo; blue" Liu Yuxi wrote that the famous spotted bamboo of South China was "langgan colored".

== Geographic sources ==
Chinese texts list many diverse locations from where langgan occurred.

Several classical works associate mythical langan trees with Kunlun Mountain (far west or northwest China), and two gives sources of actual langgan gemstones, the Shujing says it was tribute from Yong Province (present day Gansu and Shaanxi) and the Guanzi says the Kunlun desert (Xinjiang and Tibet).

Official Chinese histories record langgan coming from different sources. The 3rd-century Weilüe, 5th-century Hou Hanshu, 6th-century Wei shu, and 7th-century Liang shu list langgan among the products of Daqin, which depending on context meant the Near East or the Eastern Roman Empire, especially Syria. The Liang shu also says it was found in Kucha (modern Aksu Prefecture, Xinjiang), the 7th-century Jinshu says in Shaanxi, and the 10th-century Tangshu says in India. The Jiangnan Bielu history of the Southern Tang (937–976) says langgan was mined at Pingze 平澤 in Shu (Sichuan Province).

The Daoist scholar and alchemist Tao Hongjing (456-536) notes langgan gemstone was traditionally associated with Sichuan. The Tang pharmacologist Su Jing 蘇敬 (d. 674) reports that it came from the distant Man tribes of the Yunnan–Guizhou Plateau and Hotan/Khotan. Accurately identifying geographic sources may be complicated by langgan referring to more than one mineral, as discussed next.

== Identifications ==
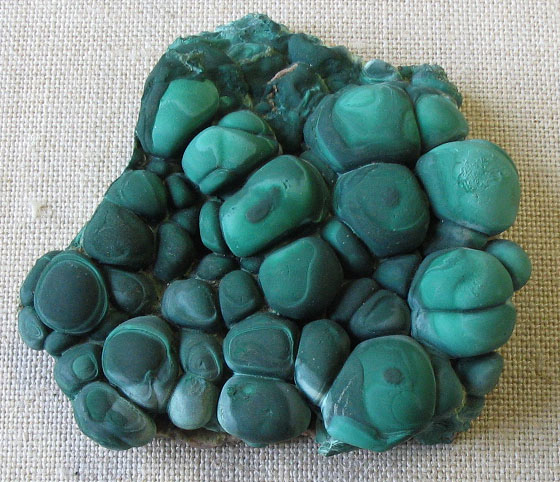
Botryoidal malachite

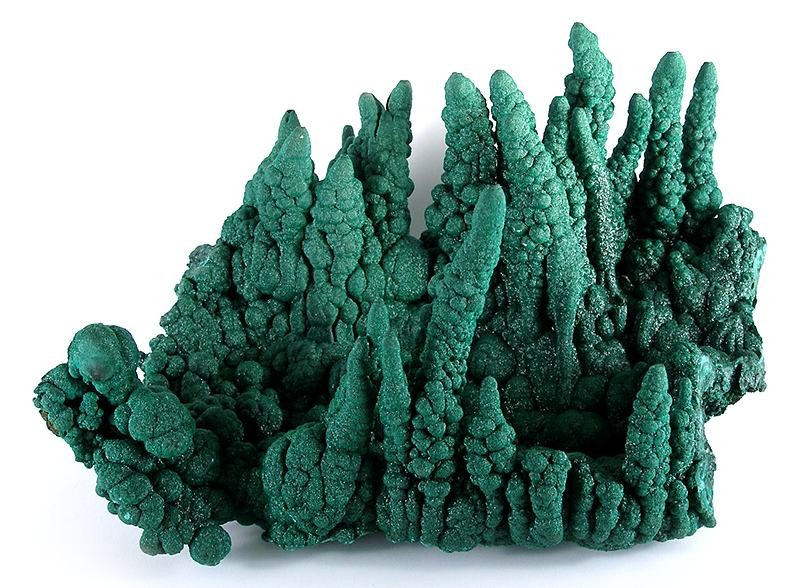
Malachite stalactites

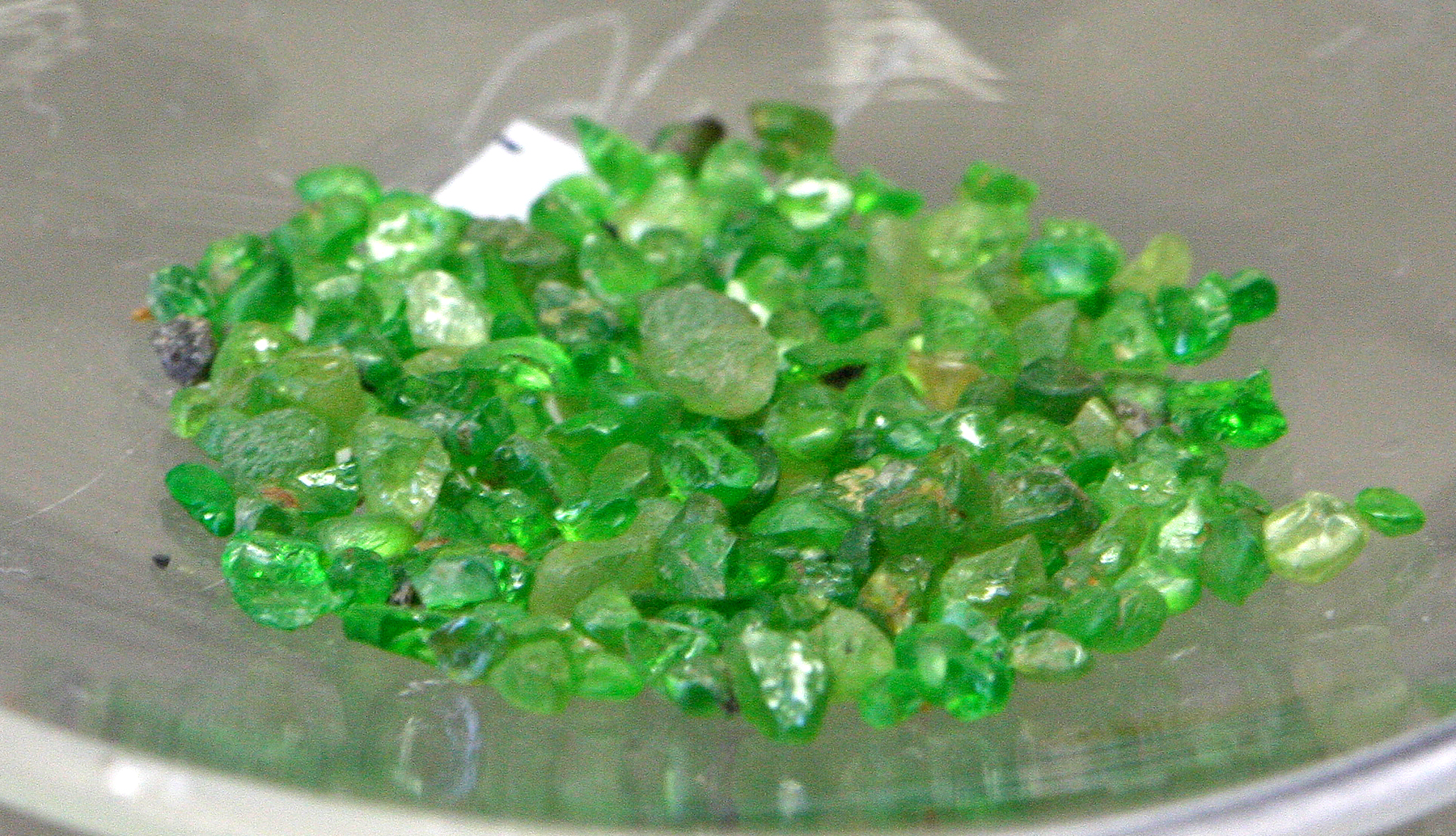
Demantoid

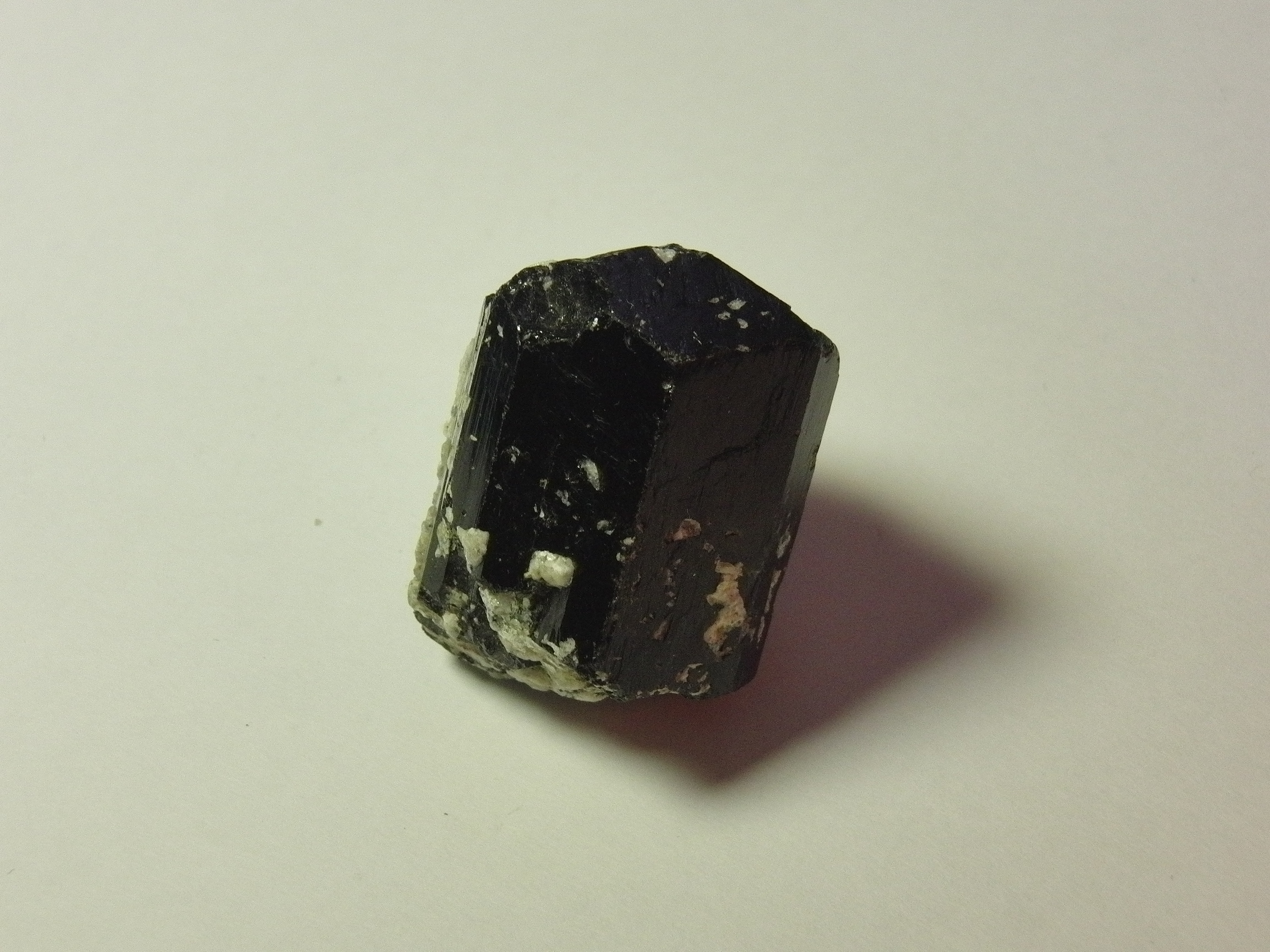
Tourmaline

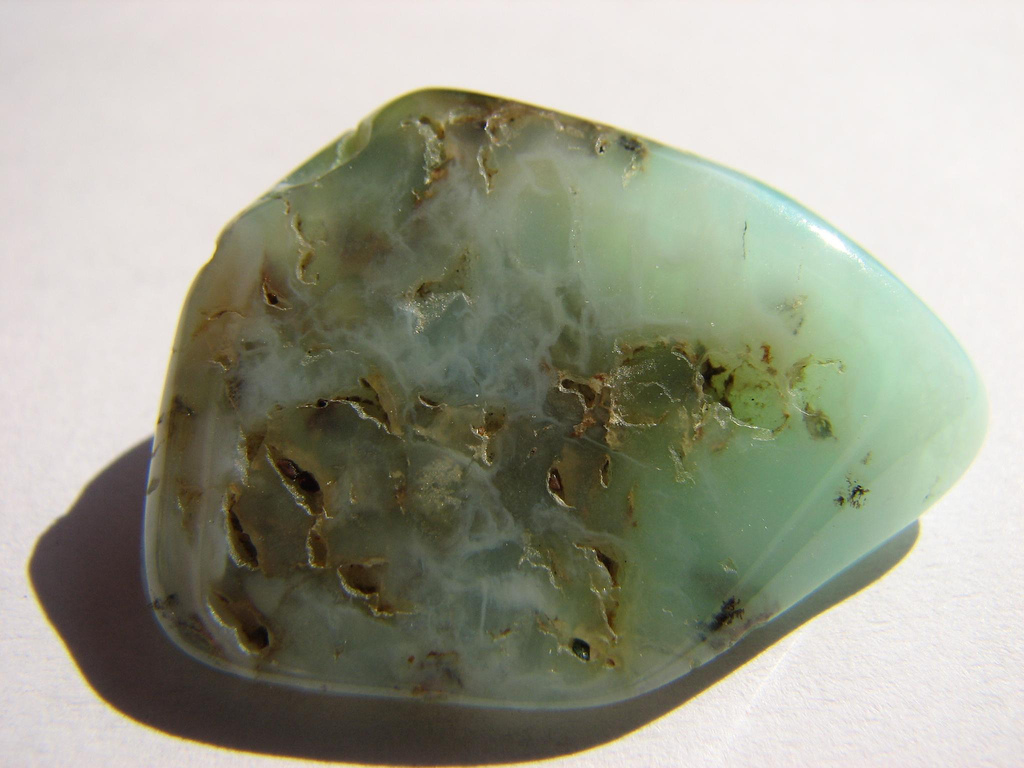
Chrysoprase

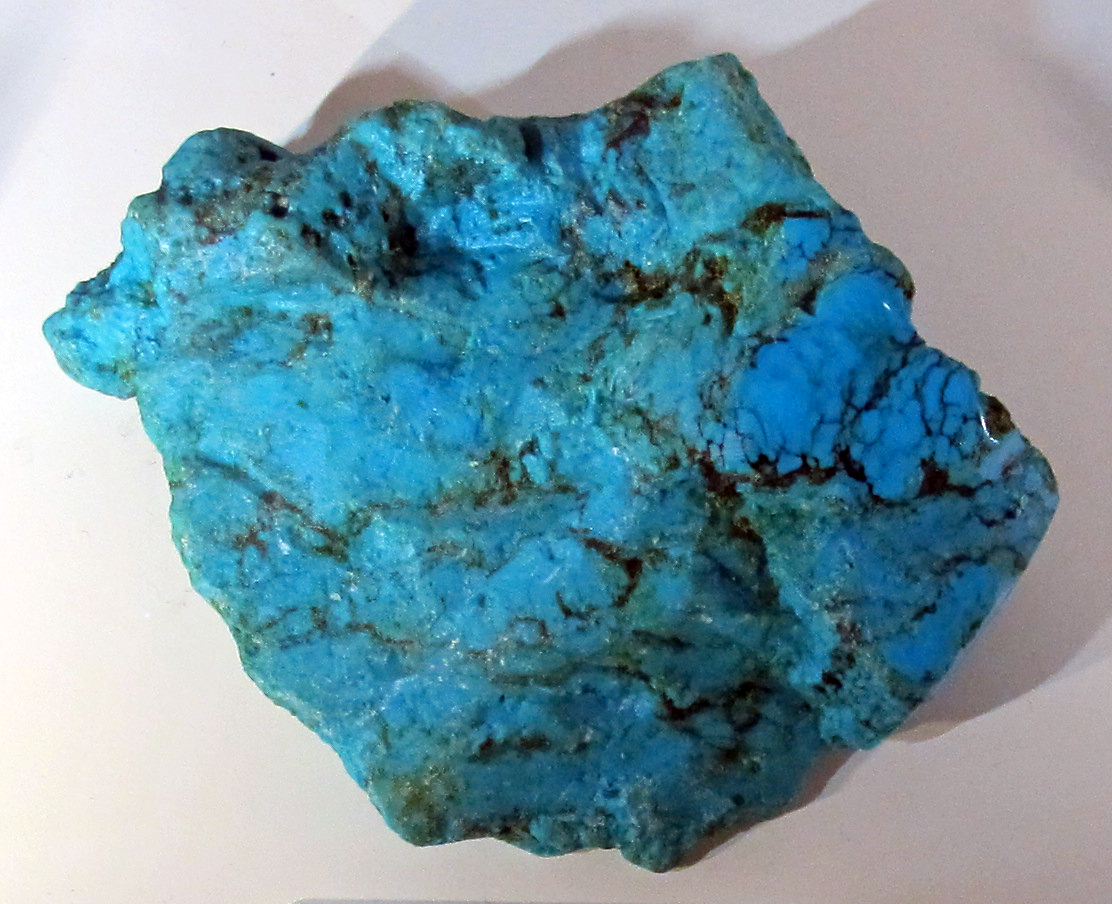
Turquoise

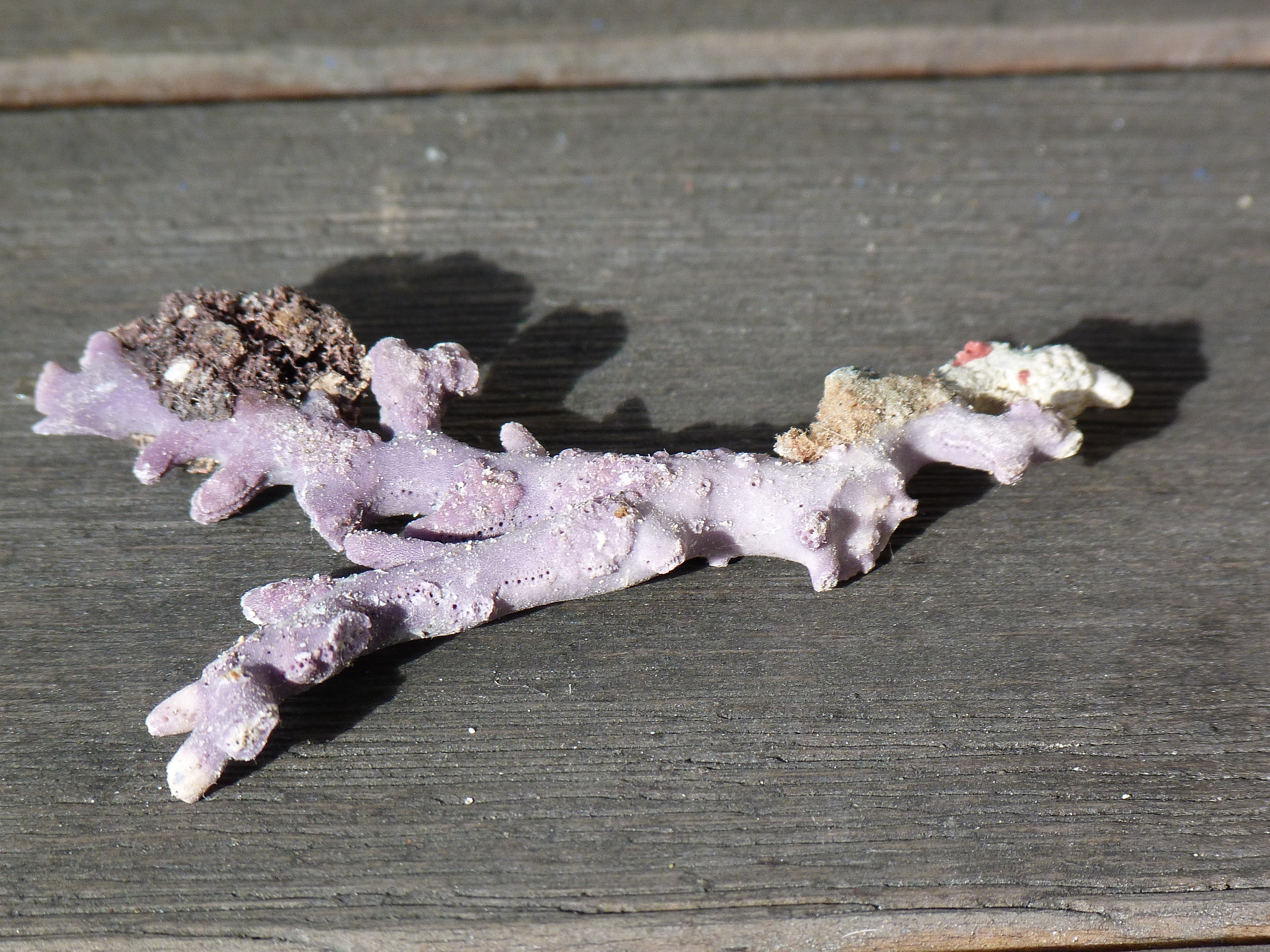
Blue coral, Heliopora coerula

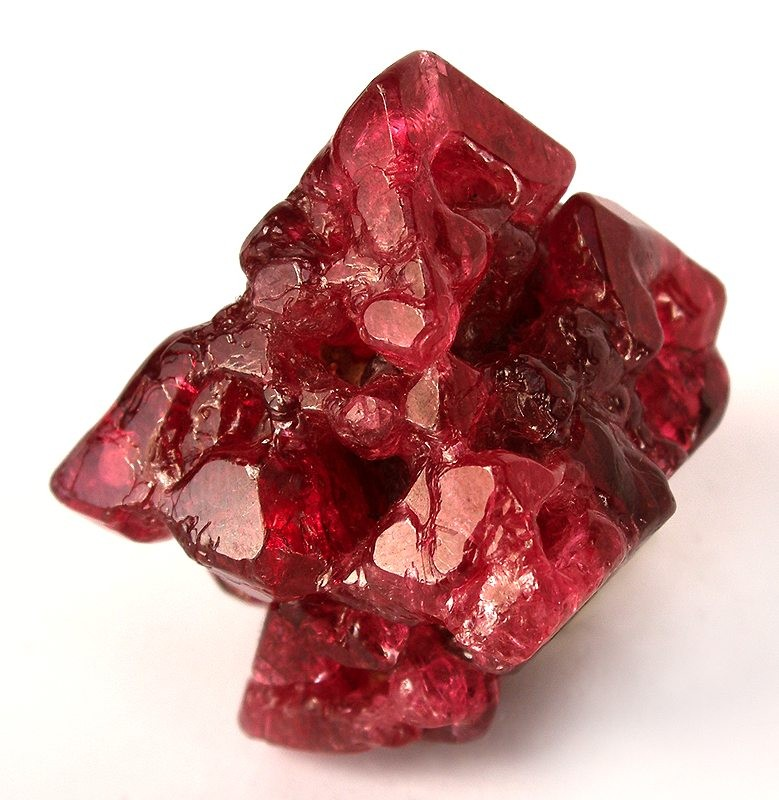
Spinel

The precise referent of the Chinese name langgan 琅玕 is uncertain in the present day. Scholars have described it as an "enigmatic archaism of politely pleasant or poetic usage", and "one of the most elusive terms in Chinese mineralogy". Identifications of langgan comprise at least three categories: Blue-green langgan was first recorded circa 4th century BCE, Coral langgan from the 8th century, and Red langgan is from an uncertain date.

Edward H. Schafer, an eminent scholar of Tang dynasty literature and history, discussed langgan in several books and articles. His proposed identifications gradually changed from Mediterranean red coral, to coral or a glass-like gem, to chrysoprase or demantoid, to coral or red spinel, and ultimately to malachite.

=== Blue-green langgan ===
langgan was a 青; qīng; "green; blue; greenish black" (see Blue–green distinction in language) gemstone of lustrous appearance mentioned in numerous classical texts. They listed it among historical imperial tribute products presented from the far western regions of China, and as the mineral-fruit of the legendary langgan trees of immortality on Mount Kunlun.

Schafer's 1978 monograph on langgan sought to identify the treasured blue-green gemstone, if it ever had a unique identity, and concluded the most plausible identification is malachite, a bright green mineral that was anciently used as a copper ore and an ornamental stone. Two early Chinese mineralogical authorities identified langgan as malachite, commonly called 孔雀石; kǒngquèshí; 'peacock stone' or 石綠; shílǜ; 'stone green'.

Comparing blue-green stones that were known in early East Asia, Schafer disqualified several conceivable identities; demantoid garnet and green tourmaline are rarely of gem quality, while neither apple-green chrysoprase nor light greenish-blue turquoise typically have dark hues. This leaves malachite,

This handsome green carbonate of copper has important credentials. It is often found in copper mines, and is therefore regularly at the disposal of copper- and bronze-producing peoples. It has, in certain varieties, a lovely silky luster, caused by its fibrous structure. It is soft and easily cut. It takes a good polish. It was commonly made into beads both in the western and eastern worlds. Above all, even uncut malachite often has a nodular or botryoidal structure, like little clumps of bright green beads, one of the classical forms attributed to lang-kan. Sometimes, too, it is stalactitic, like little stone trees.

Furthermore, archeology confirms that malachite was an important gemstone of pre-Han China. Inlays of malachite and turquoise decorated many early Chinese bronze weapons and ritual vessels.

Tang sources continued to record blue-green langgan. Su Jing's 652 新修本草; Xinxiu bencao said it was a glassy substance similar to liúli (琉璃; "colored glaze; glass; glossy gem") that was imported from the Man tribes in the Southwest and from Khotan. In 762, Emperor Daizong of Tang proclaimed a new era name of 寶應; Baoying; "Treasure Response" in honor of the discovery of thirteen auspicious treasures in Jiangsu, one of which was glassy langgan beads

=== Coral langgan ===
Tang dynasty herbalists and pharmacists changed the denotation of langgan from the traditional blue-green gemstone to a kind of coral. Chen Cangqi's c. 720 Bencao shiyi (本草拾遺; "Collected Addenda to the Pharmacopoeia") described it a pale red coral, growing like a branched tree on the bottom of the sea, fished by means of nets, and after coming out of the water gradually darkens and turns blue.

Langan already had an established connection with coral. Chinese mythology matches two antipodean paradises of Mount Kunlun in the far west and Mount Penglai located on an island in the far eastern Bohai Sea. Both mountains had mythic plants and trees of immortality that attracted Daoist xian transcendents; Kunlun's red langgan trees with blue-green fruits were paralleled by Penglai's shanhu shu (珊瑚樹; "red coral trees").

Regarding what variety of blue or green branching coral was identified as this "mineralized subaqueous shrub" langgan. Since it must have been a coral attractive enough to be comparable with the extravagant myths of Kunlun, Schafer suggests considering the blue coral Heliopora coerula. It is the only living species in the family Helioporidae, the only octocoral known to produce a massive skeleton, and was found throughout Pacific and Indian Oceans, although the IUCN currently considers it a vulnerable species.

Du Wan's c. 1124 Yunlin shipu mineralogy book has a section (100) on 琅玕石; langgan shi that mentions shanhu "coral".

A coral-like stone found in shallow water along the coast of Ningbo Zhejiang. Some specimens are two or three feet high. They must be pulled up by ropes let down from rafts. Though white when first taken from the water, they turn a dull purple after a while. They are patterned everywhere with circles, like ginger branches, and are rather brittle. Though the natives hold …

Li Shizhen's 1578 Bencao Gangmu classic pharmacopeia objects to applying the term langgan to these marine invertebrates, which should properly be called shanhu while langgan should only be applied to the stone occurring in the mountains. Li's commentary suggests that the terminological confusion arose from the Shuowen jiezi definition of shanhu: "coral is red colored and grows in the ocean or in the mountains" (珊瑚: 色赤生於海或生於山). This puzzling description of mountain corals was more likely a textual misunderstanding than a reference to coral fossils.

=== Red langgan ===
The most recent, and least historically documented, identification of langgan is a red gemstone. The Chinese geologist Chang Hung-Chao (Zhang Hongzhao) propagated this explanation when his book about geological terms in Chinese literature identified langgan as malachite, and noted an alternative construal of reddish spinel or balas ruby from the famous mines at Badakhshan. Some authors have cited Chang's balas ruby identification of langgan; others have used, or even confused, it with ruby, in translations (e.g., "precious rubies").

However, Schafer demonstrates that Chang's "supposed" textual evidence for red langgan is tenuous and suggests that Guo Pu's Shanhai jing commentary created this mineralogical confusion. Guo glosses the langgan tree as red, but is unclear whether this refers to the tree itself or its gem-like fruit. Compare Birrell's and Bokenkamp's Shanhai jing translations of "red jade" and "green kernels from scarlet gem trees". Chang misquotes dan'gan (丹矸; "cinnabar rock") from the Xunzi as dan'gan (丹玕; "cinnabar 'gan"), and cites one textual occurrence of the term. The Shangqing Daoist Dadong zhenjing (大洞真經; "Authentic Scripture of the Great Cavern") records a heavenly palace named Dan'gan dian (丹玕殿; "Basilica of the Cinnabar 'Gan"). Admitting the possibility of interpreting 玕; gan as a monosyllabic truncation for 琅玕; langgan, comparable with reading 红珀; hongpo for honghupo (红琥珀; "red amber"), Schafer concludes there is insufficient dan'gan evidence for an explicit red variety of langgan.

The lyrical term langgan occurs 87 times in the huge Complete Tang Poems collection of Tang poetry, with only two 紅琅玕; hong langgen; "red 'langgan" usages by the Buddhist monk-poets Guanxiu (831-912) and Ji Qi 齊己 (863-937). Both poems use langgan to describe "red coral", the latter (贈念法華經) uses shanhu in the same line: 珊瑚捶打紅琅玕; "coral beating on red 'langgan" in cold waters.

=== Dictionary translations ===
Chinese-English dictionaries illustrate the multifaceted difficulties of identifying langgan. Compare the following list.

Langgan Translation Equivalents in Chinese-English Dictionaries
Dictionary	Gan 玕	Lang 琅	Langgan 琅玕
A Dictionary of the Chinese Language	琅玕 a certain valuable stone; the name of a tree.	琅玕	resembles a pearl; a stone of an inferior sort. Occurs forming a part of various other proper names.
Chinese and English Dictionary	As 琅玕, a beautiful pebble, next to a gem, brought from the west; it has the form and appearance of a pearl.	As 琅玕, a stone like a pearl; coral found in the hills.	a beautiful pebble, next to a gem, brought from the west; it has the form and appearance of a pearl.
A Syllabic Dictionary of the Chinese Language	An inferior gem, which resembles a pearl. 琅玕 a sort of coral, or the ornaments made of a branching coral like the genus Isis.	A whitish stone, prized as an ornament.	white coral of a firm texture, branched like a Gorgonia, but not susceptible of polish.
A Chinese-English Dictionary	inferior kind of gem. See 琅.	A kind of white carnelian.	some kind of precious stone.
A Chinese-English Dictionary	An inferior kind of gem. See 琅.	A kind of white carnelian.	some kind of precious stone like jade; red jade.
Mathews' Chinese-English Dictionary	Inferior kind of gem.	A kind of white carnelian.	a reddish kind of jade.
Far East Chinese-English Dictionary	a kind of inferior gem; a stone slightly inferior in quality to jade.	1. A kind of stone resembling jade 2. clean and white; pure; spotless 3. a Chinese family name.	a stone resembling jade.
ABC Chinese-English Dictionary	[see 琅玕]	[see 琅玕]	pearl-like stone.
A Student's Dictionary of Classical and Medieval Chinese	[see 琅玕]	[see 琅玕]	gemstone-jade, prob. ref. originally to malachite, but regularly used as name of a gemstone from distant lands or supernal regions, appropriate to decorate persons of special beauty or power, to nourish transcendent beings, to grow as trees in paradise realms.

Most of these bilingual Chinese dictionaries cross-reference lang and gan to langgan, but a few translate lang and gan independently. In terms of Chinese word morphology, 琅; láng is a free morpheme that can appear alone (for instance, a surname) or in other compound words (such as 琺琅; fàláng; "enamel" and 琅琊山; Lángyá shān; "Mount Langya (Anhui)") while 玕; gān is a bound morpheme that only occurs in the compound langgan and does not have independent meaning.

The origin of Giles' lang translation "a kind of white carnelian" is unknown, unless it derives from Williams' "a whitish stone". It was copied in Mathews' and various other Chinese dictionaries up to the online standard Unihan Database "a variety of white carnelian; pure". "White carnelian" is a marketing name for "white or whitish chalcedony of faint carnelian color". Carnelian is usually reddish-brown while common chalcedony colors are white, grey, brown, and blue.
