= Dihydrotanshinone I =

- 2D Structure 2D Structure

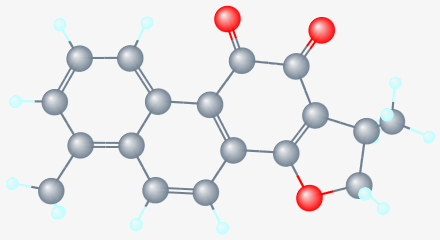
- 3D Conformer 3D Conformer

Names
- IUPAC name 4,17β-Dimethyl-15-oxagona-1,3,5,7,9,13-hexaene-11,12-dione
- Systematic IUPAC name (1R)-1,6-Dimethyl-1,2-dihydrophenanthro[1,2-b]furan-10,11-dione
- Other names 15,16-dihydrotanshinone I, phenanthro[1,2-b]furan-10,11-dione, 1,2-dihydro-1,6-dimethyl-

Identifiers
| CAS Number | 87205-99-0 |
| 3D model (JSmol) | Interactive image |
| Abbreviations | DI |
| ChemSpider | 9600799 |
| ECHA InfoCard | 100.222.905 |
| PubChem CID | 11425923 |
| UNII | 562G9360V6 |
| CompTox Dashboard (EPA) | DTXSID20236187 |
- InChI: InChI=1S/C18H14O3/c1-9-4-3-5-12-11(9)6-7-13-15(12)17(20)16(19)14-10(2)8-21-18(13)14/h3-7,10H,8H2,1-2H3/t10-/m0/s1 Key: HARGZZNYNSYSGJ-JTQLQIEISA-N; InChI=1/C18H14O3/c1-9-4-3-5-12-11(9)6-7-13-15(12)17(20)16(19)14-10(2)8-21-18(13)14/h3-7,10H,8H2,1-2H3
- SMILES: O=C2c3c(C=1OCC(C=1C2=O)C)ccc4c(cccc34)C

Properties
| Chemical formula | C_{18}H_{14}O_{3} |
| Molar mass | 278.307 g·mol^{−1} |
| Appearance | Red powder |
| Density | 1.32 g/cm^{3} |
| Boiling point | 479.2 °C (894.6 °F; 752.3 K) |
| Solubility in water | 12.9 mg/L (est.) |
| Solubility in ethanol | 1 mg/mL, clear orange to red |
| log P | log Kow = 3.93 (est) |
| Vapor pressure | 3.41×10^{−9} mmHg |

Hazards
- GHS labelling
| Pictograms | (GHS07: Exclamation mark) (GHS09: Environmental hazard) |
| Signal word | Warning |
| Hazard statements | H302, H400 |
| Precautionary statements | P264, P270, P273, P301+P312, P330, P391, P501 |
- Except where otherwise noted, data are given for materials in their standard state (at 25 °C [77 °F], 100 kPa). Infobox references

Dihydrotanshinone I (DI) is a naturally occurring compound extracted from Salvia miltiorrhiza Bunge, also known as Chinese sage, red sage root, and the Chinese herbal Dan Shen. It belongs to a class of lipophilic abietane diterpenoids and has been reported to have cytotoxicity to a variety of tumor cells, as well as antiviral effects in vitro. In a study Dihydrotanshinone I inhibited the 17,20-lyase activity of CYP17A1 while having minor impact on 17α-hydroxylase and CYP21A2 activities. Since they were first discovered, over 40 related compounds and over 50 hydrophilic compounds have been isolated from Dan Shen.
