= Tanshinone =

Chemical structure of tanshinone I

Tanshinones are a class of chemical compounds. Examples include dihydrotanshinone, tanshinone I, or tanshinone IIA. These compounds are all naturally occurring and can all be isolated from Salvia miltiorrhiza.

Dihydrotanshinone I has been reported to have cytotoxicity to a variety of tumor cells.

Tanshinone I is anti-inflammatory, and modulates or prevents breast cancer metastasis by regulating adhesion molecules.

Tanshinone IIA is anti-inflammatory, an antioxidant, and cytotoxic against a variety of cell lines. It inhibits CYP2J2.

== See also ==
- Miltirone (rosmariquinone)
