= Lute (material) =

Sealant and/or glue used in ancient alchemy and pottery

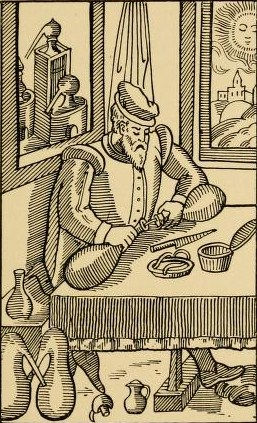
Alchemist fixing his apparatus, with luting box and knife on the table (engraving, 1576)

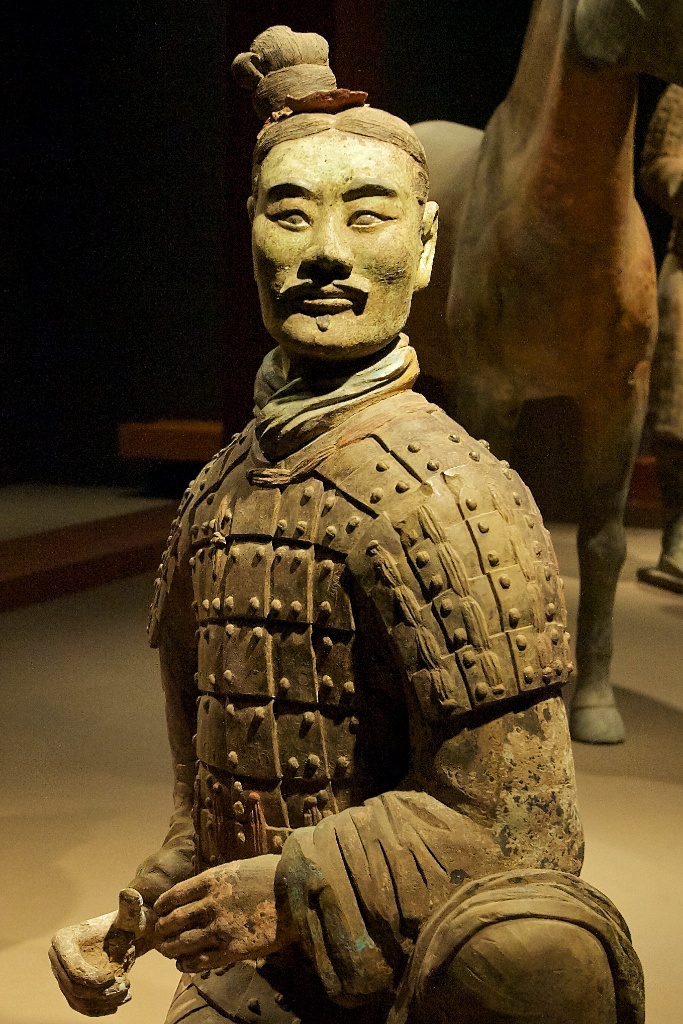
Soldier from the Terracotta Army, made of several parts luted together before firing

Lute (from Latin lutum 'mud, clay etc.') was a substance used to seal and affix apparatus employed in chemistry and alchemy, and to protect component vessels against heat damage by fire; it was also used to line furnaces. Lutation was thus the act of "cementing vessels with lute".

In pottery, luting is a technique for joining pieces of unfired leather-hard clay together, using a wet clay slip or slurry as adhesive. The complete object is then fired. Large objects are often built up in this way, for example the figures of the Terracotta Army in ancient China. The edges being joined might be scored or cross-hatched to promote adhesion, but clay and water are the only materials used.

== Uses ==
Lute was commonly used in distillation, which required airtight vessels and connectors to ensure that no vapours were lost; thus it was employed by chemists and alchemists, the latter being known to refer to it as "lutum sapientiae" or the "lute of Wisdom".

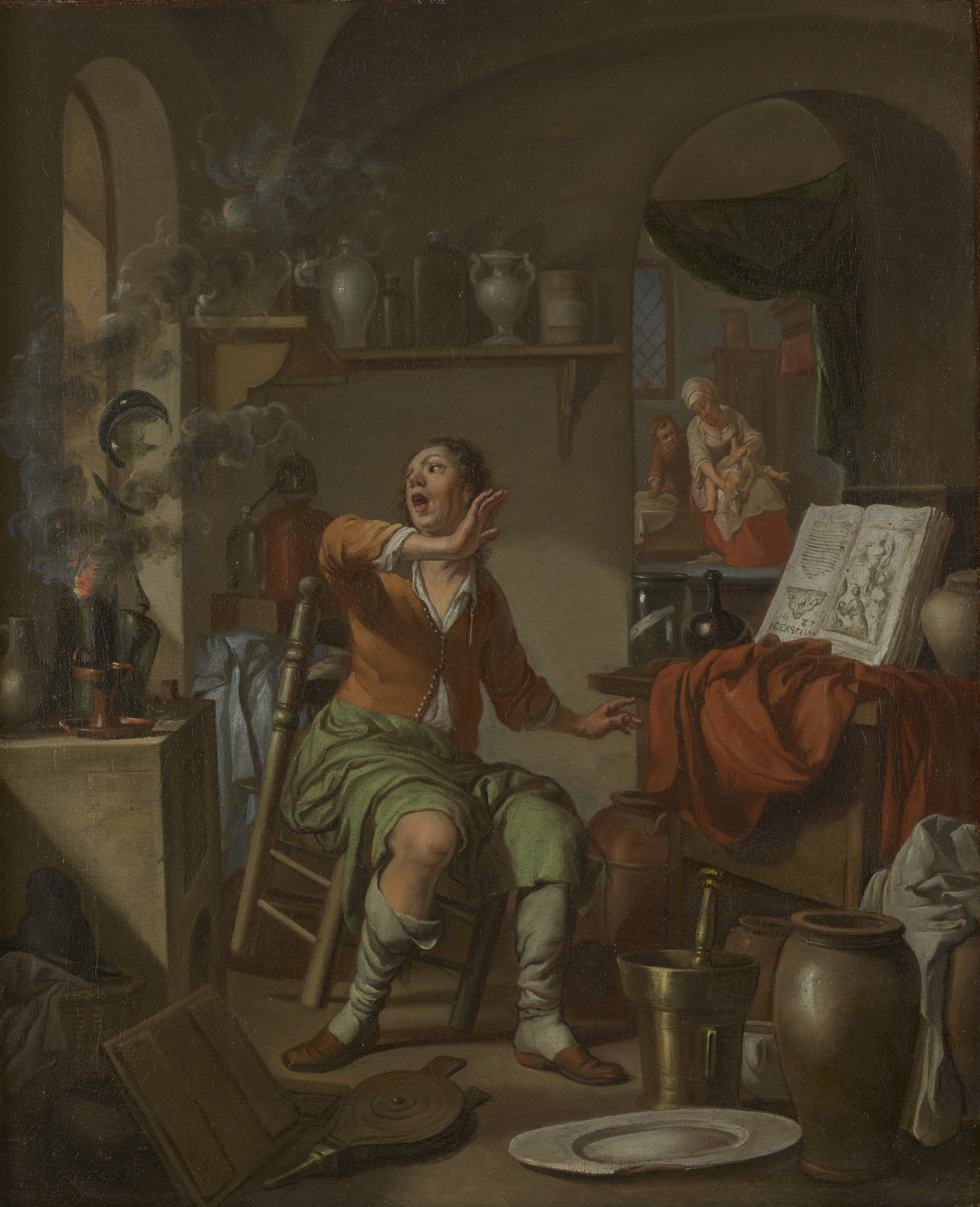
The Alchemist’s Experiment Takes Fire, Hendrick Heerschop, 1687 (Chemical Heritage Foundation)

The earthen and glass vessels commonly employed in these processes were very vulnerable to cracking, both on heating and on cooling; one way of protecting them was by coating the vessels with lute and allowing it to set. One mixture for this purpose included "fat earth" (terra pinguis), Windsor loam, sand, iron filings or powdered glass, and cow's hair.

Another use for lute was to act as a safety valve, preventing the buildup of vapour pressure from shattering a vessel and possibly causing an explosion. For this purpose, a hole was bored in the flask and covered with luting material of a particular composition, which was kept soft so that excessive buildup of vapour would cause it to come away from the vessel, thus releasing the pressure safely. This process could also be performed manually by the operator removing and reaffixing the lute as required. Lute was also used to effect repairs to cracked glass vessels. In The Alchemist’s Experiment Takes Fire, 1687, one alembic is exploding; the luting used to seal a receiving bottle to another alembic can be seen behind the alchemist's upraised arm.

Lute was frequently applied to the joints between vessels (such as retorts and receivers), making them airtight and preventing vapour from escaping; this was especially important for more penetrating "spiritous" vapours and required a mixture that would set hard - such as a mix of quicklime and either egg white or size etc. However a stronger lute had to be used to confine acid vapours, and for this purpose fat earth and linseed oil were mixed to form "fat lute", which could be rolled into cylinders of convenient size, ready for use. Where the vapour was more "aqueous", and less penetrating, strips of paper affixed with sizing would suffice or "bladder long steeped in water".

Another related use for lute was for lining furnaces, and was described as far back as the 16th century by Georg Agricola in his "De re metallica".

== Composition ==
Fat Lute was made of clay mixed with oil and beaten until it had the consistency of putty. It could be stored in a sealed earthenware vessel, which retained moisture and kept the material pliable. An alchemical writer of the 16th century recommended a lute made up of "loam mixed to a compost with horse dung" while the French chemist Chaptal used a similar mixture of "fat earth" and horse dung, mixed in water and formed into a soft paste.

Linseed meal or Almond meal could be made into a lute by mixing with water or dissolved starch or weak glue, and used in combination with strips of rag or moistened bladder; however, it was combustible which limited its range of applications.

Lime could be made into an effective lute by mixing it with egg white or glue; for sealing joints it was used in conjunction with strips of rag.

Linen rags mixed with paste, or strips of Bladder soaked in warm water, then coated with paste or egg white, also served as a lute.

Fire Lute was used to protect vessels from heat damage. It consisted of clay mixed with sand and either horse-hair or straw or tow (coarse, broken fibre of crops such as flax, hemp, or jute). It had to be allowed to dry thoroughly before use to be effective.

Fusible lute was used to coat earthenware vessels to ensure impermeability. A mixture of Borax and slaked lime, mixed with water into a fine paste, served this purpose.

Parker's Cement, Plaster of Paris and Fusible fluxes (a clay and Borax mixture in 10:1 proportion, mixed to a paste in water) could all be used as lutes, rendering heat protection and air-tightness. Stourbridge clay mixed with water could withstand the highest heat of any lute.

Hard cement was also commonly used to join glass vessels and fix cracks; it was composed of resin, beeswax and either brick dust or "bole earth", or red ochre or venetian red. Soft cement, made of yellow wax, turpentine and venetian red, was also used for repair.
