= Science and Civilisation in China =

Series of volumes by, edited by, or planned by Joseph Needham

Science and Civilization in China
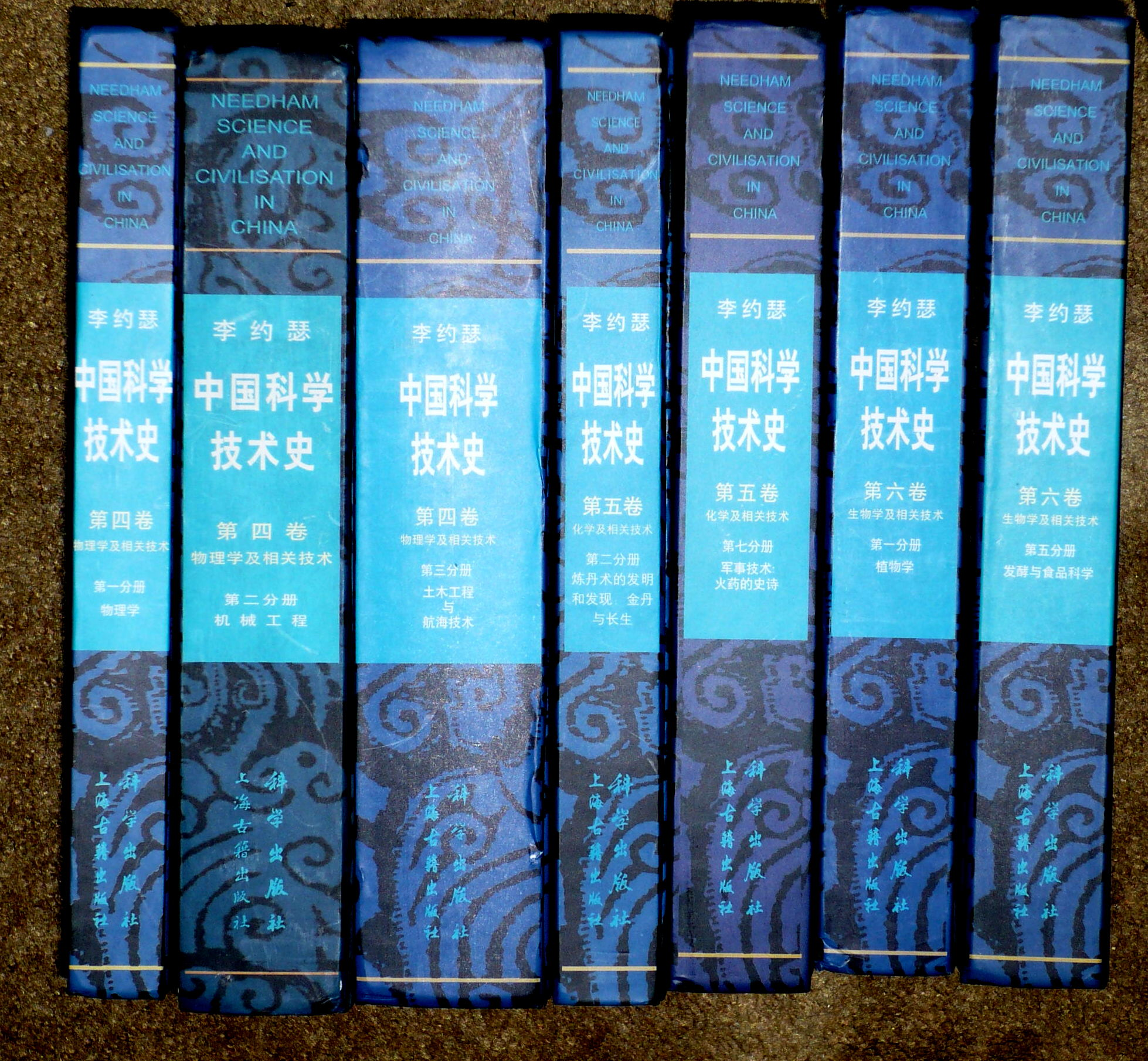
- Science and Civilisation in China (Chinese translation)
- Author: Joseph Needham
- Original title: Science and Civilisation in China

Science and Civilisation in China (1954–present) is an ongoing series of books about the history of science and technology in China published by Cambridge University Press. It was initiated and edited by British historian Joseph Needham (1900–1995). Needham was a well-respected scientist before undertaking this encyclopedia and was even responsible for the "S" in UNESCO. To date there have been seven volumes in twenty-seven books. The series was on the Modern Library Board's 100 Best Nonfiction books of the 20th century. Needham's work was the first of its kind to praise Chinese scientific contributions and provide their history and connection to global knowledge in contrast to eurocentric historiography.

By asking the questions of why modern science did not develop in China, and why China was technologically superior to the West prior to the 16th century, Needham’s Science and Civilisation in China is also recognized as an influential work in stimulating the discourse on the multicultural roots of modern science.

In 1954, Needham—along with an international team of collaborators—initiated the project to study the science, technology, and civilisation of ancient China. This project produced a series of volumes published by Cambridge University Press. The project is still continuing under the guidance of the Publications Board of the Needham Research Institute (NRI), chaired by Christopher Cullen.

Volume 3 of the encyclopedia was the first body of work to describe Chinese improvements to cartography, geology, seismology and mineralogy. It also includes descriptions of nautical technology, sailing charts, and wheel-maps.

Needham's transliteration of Chinese characters uses the Wade-Giles system, though the aspirate apostrophe (e.g., ch'i) was rendered 'h' (viz. chhi; traditional Chinese: 氣; Mandarin Pinyin: qì). However, it was abandoned in favor of the pinyin system by the NRI board in April 2004, with Volume 5, Part 11 becoming the first to use the new system.

== Background ==
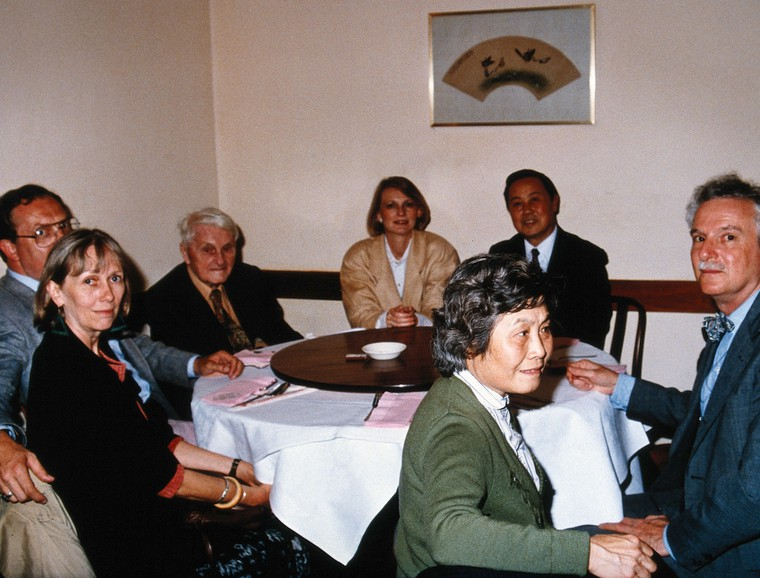
Joseph Needham surrounded by Chinese History and Sciences scholars in 1988

=== Development ===
Joseph Needham's interest in the history of Chinese science developed while he worked as an Embryologist at Cambridge University. At the time, Needham had already published works relating to the history of science, including his 1934 book titled A History of Embryology, and was open to expanding his historical scientific knowledge. Needham's first encounter with Chinese culture occurred in 1937 when three Chinese medical students arrived to work with him at the Cambridge Biochemical Laboratory. Needham's interest in Chinese civilization and scientific progress grew as a result and led him to learn Chinese from his students. Two of those students, Wang Ling, and Lu Gwei-djen, would later become his collaborators on Science and Civilisation in China.

In 1941, China's eastern universities were forced to relocate to the west as a result of the Second Sino-Japanese War. Chinese academics sought the help of the British government in an effort to preserve their intellectual life. In 1942, Needham was selected and appointed as a diplomat by the British government and tasked with traveling to China and assessing the situation. During his three years there, Needham realised that the Chinese had developed techniques and mechanisms which were centuries older than their European counterparts. Needham became concerned with the exclusion of China in the Western history of science and began to question why the Chinese ceased to develop new techniques after the 16th century.

=== Publication ===
Armed with his new-found knowledge, Needham returned to Cambridge in 1948 and began working on a book with one of the Chinese medical students he met in Cambridge, Wang Ling, who was now a professor at a university. Initially, he planned on releasing only one volume of his findings through the Cambridge University Press, but later changed his mind and proposed up to eleven volumes. In 1954, Needham published the first volume of Science and Civilisation in China, which was well received and was followed by other volumes which focused on specific scientific fields and topics. Needham, along with his collaborators, was personally involved in all of the volumes of Science and Civilization, up until Needham's death in 1995. After Needham's death, Cambridge University established the Needham Research Institute. Scholars of the institution continue Needham's work and have published 8 additional volumes of Science and Civilisation in China, since his death.

== Volumes ==
Volume	Title	Contributors	Date	Notes
Vol. 1	Introductory Orientations	Wang Ling (research assistant)	1954	
Vol. 2	History of Scientific Thought	Wang Ling (research assistant)	1956	OCLC
Vol. 3	Mathematics and the Sciences of the Heavens and Earth	Wang Ling (research assistant)	1959	OCLC
Vol. 4, Part 1	Physics and Physical Technology; Physics	Wang Ling (research assistant), with cooperation of Kenneth Robinson	1962	OCLC
Vol. 4, Part 2	Physics and Physical Technology; Mechanical Engineering	Wang Ling (collaborator)	1965	
Vol. 4, Part 3	Physics and Physical Technology; Civil Engineering and Nautics	Wang Ling and Lu Gwei-djen (collaborators)	1971	
Vol. 5, Part 1	Chemistry and Chemical Technology; Paper and Printing	Tsien Tsuen-Hsuin	1985	
Vol. 5, Part 2	Chemistry and Chemical Technology; Spagyrical Discovery and Invention: Magisteries of Gold and Immortality	Lu Gwei-djen (collaborator)	1974	
Vol. 5, Part 3	Chemistry and Chemical Technology; Spagyrical Discovery and Invention: Historical Survey, from Cinnabar Elixirs to Synthetic Insulin	Ho Ping-Yu and Lu Gwei-djen (collaborators)	1976	
Vol. 5, Part 4	Chemistry and Chemical Technology; Spagyrical Discovery and Invention: Apparatus and Theory	Lu Gwei-djen (collaborator), with contributions by Nathan Sivin	1980	
Vol. 5, Part 5	Chemistry and Chemical Technology; Spagyrical Discovery and Invention: Physiological Alchemy	Lu Gwei-djen (collaborator)	1983	
Vol. 5, Part 6	Chemistry and Chemical Technology; Military Technology: Missiles and Sieges	Robin D.S. Yates, Krzysztof Gawlikowski, Edward McEwen, Wang Ling (collaborators)	1994	
Vol. 5, Part 7	Chemistry and Chemical Technology; Military Technology: The Gunpowder Epic	Ho Ping-Yu, Lu Gwei-djen, Wang Ling (collaborators)	1987	
Vol. 5, Part 8	Chemistry and Chemical Technology; Military Technology: Shock Weapons and Cavalry	Lu Gwei-djen (collaborator)		
Vol. 5, Part 9	Chemistry and Chemical Technology; Textile Technology: Spinning and Reeling	Dieter Kuhn	1988	
Vol. 5, Part 10	"Work in progress"			
Vol. 5, Part 11	Chemistry and Chemical Technology; Ferrous Metallurgy	Donald B. Wagner	2008	
Vol. 5, Part 12	Chemistry and Chemical Technology; Ceramic Technology	Rose Kerr, Nigel Wood, contributions by Ts'ai Mei-fen and Zhang Fukang	2004	
Vol. 5, Part 13	Chemistry and Chemical Technology; Mining	Peter Golas	1999	
Vol. 6, Part 1	Biology and Biological Technology; Botany	Lu Gwei-djen (collaborator), with contributions by Huang Hsing-Tsung	1986	
Vol. 6, Part 2	Biology and Biological Technology; Agriculture	Francesca Bray	1984	
Vol. 6, Part 3	Biology and Biological Technology; Agro-industries and Forestry	Christian A. Daniels and Nicholas K. Menzies	1996	
Vol. 6, Part 4	Biology and Biological Technology; Traditional Botany: An Ethnobotanical Approach	Georges Métailié	2015	
Vol. 6, Part 5	Biology and Biological Technology; Fermentations and Food Science	Huang Hsing-Tsung	2000	
Vol. 6, Part 6	Biology and Biological Technology; Medicine	Lu Gwei-djen, Nathan Sivin (editor)	2000	
Vol. 7, Part 1	The Social Background; Language and Logic	Christoph Harbsmeier	1998	
Vol. 7, Part 2	The Social Background; General Conclusions and Reflections	Kenneth Girdwood Robinson (editor), Ray Huang (collaborator), introduction by Mark Elvin	2004	OCLC

== Summaries ==
There have been two summaries or condensations of the vast amount of material found in Science and Civilisation. The first, a one-volume popular history book by Robert Temple entitled The Genius of China, was completed in a little over 12 months to be available in 1986 for the visit of Queen Elizabeth II to China. This addressed only the contributions made by China and had a "warm welcome" from Joseph Needham in the introduction, though in the Beijing Review he criticized that it had "some mistakes ... and various statements that I would like to have seen expressed rather differently". A second was made by Colin Ronan, a writer on the history of science, who produced a five volume condensation The Shorter Science and Civilisation: An abridgement of Joseph Needham's original text, between 1980 and his death in 1995. These volumes cover:

1. China and Chinese science
2. Mathematics, astronomy, meteorology and the earth sciences
3. Magnetism, nautical technology, navigation, voyages
4. Mechanical engineering, machines, clockwork, windmills, aeronautics
5. Civil engineering, roads, bridges, hydraulic engineering

== Reception ==
=== Critical acclaim ===
Groff Conklin of Galaxy Science Fiction in 1955 said that Vol. 1 "presents a richly patterned tapestry of the development of civilization in the Far East", and that "it is for everyone who is intrigued by the unknown, whether future (science fiction) or past (scientific history)".

Jonathan Spence wrote in a 1982 New York Times article "this work is the most ambitious undertaking in Chinese studies during this century".

The New York Times obituary for Needham stated that students of China hail Needham's encyclopedia and compare him to Charles Darwin in terms of importance regarding scientific knowledge.

In 1999 Roger Hart published Beyond Science and Civilization: A Post-Needham Critique giving more analysis of Needham's work about how sciences of the West and China differed in practice to make for different historical attributes.

According to Arun Bala, the author of The Dialogue of Civilizations in the Birth of Modern Science, Needham postulates that scientific knowledge may evolve to more closely resemble Chinese philosophical views of nature; signifying his belief in Chinese inherent wisdom.

=== Criticism from scholars ===
Science and Civilisation in China was welcomed and is highly regarded among scholars because of its extensive comparative coverage of Chinese innovations. Needham established that scientific advancements, and analytical ingenuity were abundant in China in early modern times. He pointed to basic Chinese inventions ended up in the west, including the magnetic compass, and the mechanical clock, and printing. Needham also wrote that once these inventions reached they had a great impact on social life, and helped to stimulate the economy, as well as usher in the Scientific Revolution. Other scholars criticized his Marxist background, his understanding of Chinese culture, and his methodology.

Historian Robert Finlay suggested "Needham never shied away from bold generalizations" and "employs many outdated concepts and makes countless unsupported assertions". Finlay points out that Needham never focuses on individual states and regions, instead he places Chinese, Indian, Islamic, and Western achievements within the context of reciprocal relations of Eurasian cultures.

Editor of Volume 6, Nathan Sivin and Needham's research collaborator Lu Gwei-djen include updated research to support some of Needham's claims. However, Sivin is critical of Needham suggesting more research is required citing his assumptions of Taoism's role in promoting scientific feats in China.

Sociologist Toby E. Huff gives an overview of Needham's singular legacy in his book The Rise of Early Modern Science: Islam, China, and the West. But Huff suggests that Needham gave many misleading impressions regarding China's supposed scientific advantages over the west.

== The Needham Question ==
=== Origins ===
After his extensive research of Chinese innovations, Joseph Needham became concerned with the question: Why did modern science stop developing in China after the 16th century? Needham believed this was due to China’s sociopolitical system which was not affected by Chinese inventions. China did not have a structure in which merchants could profit from their inventions, unlike the West. Once Chinese inventions reached Europe, they revolutionized its sociopolitical system, which used the inventions to dominate political rivals. According to Needham, Chinese innovations, such as gunpowder, the compass, paper, and printing, helped transform European feudalism into capitalism. By the end of the 15th century, Europe was actively financing scientific discoveries, and nautical exploration. The paradox of this conclusion was that Europe surpassed China in scientific innovations, using Chinese technologies.

=== Re-formulation ===
After several volumes of Science and Civilisation in China had been published, Needham was questioned about his theory of the origin of science in the West. Needham, troubled by past criticism and dismissal of his work as Marxist theory, declined to publicly state his relationship to Marxism. Later, in Needham’s work The Grand Titration, he re-framed his question as: “why, between the first century BC and the fifteenth century AD, Chinese civilization was much more efficient than occidental in applying human natural knowledge to practical human needs?” The reformulation of the question, changed the narrative of Science and Civilisation in China. Initially, the question centered around China's failure to develop scientifically after the 16th century. The focus shifted towards an examination of China’s accomplishments prior to development in Europe, this focus was addressed throughout Science and Civilisation in China.

Needham's attempt to uncover the reasoning behind China's rise and fall as an elite scientific and technologically advanced nation has been expounded upon and debated for decades including Justin Yifu Lin's University of Chicago journal article "The Needham Puzzle".

=== Scholarly Discourse ===
In the late 1950s and early 1960s, in response to Needham’s Science and Civilisation in China, Western historians insisted that modern science was unique to Western civilizations. Scholars like Roger Hart stated that Needham’s work was significant in helping change the criteria for defining modern science. In Hart’s Imagined Civilizations: China, The West, and Their First Encounter, Hart introduces the idea of the “Great Divide” between “the primitive non-West and the modern West” in the history of science. Hart explains the concept of the “Great Divide” as the perception that non-Western civilizations practiced false sciences and he criticizes the Eurocentric claim that the development of modern science was uniquely Western.

Bala’s The Dialogue of Civilizations in the Birth of Modern Science examines historical and epistemological presumptions in order to break from the Eurocentric view of the development of modern science. Needham’s juxtaposition of the attributes of Eastern and Western science influenced Bala to postulate that the future of science could be close to the Chinese view of nature. Needham and his co-authors are credited for amassing a plethora of evidence regarding the influence and contributions of Chinese technologies and ideas that allowed for the growth of modern science in Europe.

Some historians praise the standard of quality and thoroughness maintained throughout the volumes of Science and Civilization in China, but others questioned the accuracy of its contents. Georges Métailié expressed concerns over Needham’s methodology when he discovered that certain dates quoted by Needham could not be supported with sufficient evidence. Despite the common criticism of Science and Civilization in China that suggests it may have been biased by Needham’s Marxist beliefs and political leftism, scholars like Gregory Blue believe that there is insufficient evidence to support that Needham’s ideological inclinations are what drove him to formulate the Needham questions. However, historians like H. Floris Cohen did criticize Needham’s imprudent approach to his work, positing that Needham too often made his own biases apparent in his writings and attempted to propagandize his own historical narrative. Similar to how Needham criticizes other historians for exaggerating Greek influences on modern science, Needham’s critics argue that he had the proclivity to exaggerate the influences of Chinese sciences in the same fashion.

Since the publishing of the first volume of Science and Civilization in China in 1954, in the 21st century, a growing sentiment emerged among historians to dilute Europe's influence within the historical narrative of modern science. The reformulated Needham question drew the attention of scholars such as David J. Hess, a social anthropologist who referred to one of Needham’s lists in Science and Civilization in China to suggest that because the Chinese were technologically superior to the West prior to the 16th century, Chinese science was crucial to the foundation of modern science. American sinologist Nathan Sivin counters this argument by suggesting that before the scientific revolution, technology was not a good measure of scientific capacity.

The separation of scientific developments in the East and the West occurs thematically in scholarly debates over how extensively responsible the West was for the development of science. Joseph Needham contrasted the more “organic” understanding of nature that China held with the “mechanical” perspective through which the West viewed existence. While certain members of the scientific community viewed China’s science as more of a “pseudoscience,” to Needham, these advancements were part of a proto-scientific period that was later incorporated by the West after the 16th century.

Needham contrasts Western modern science and Eastern natural science as “modern” and “primitive” sciences that were differentiated by their “universality”. He points out that because primitive sciences of the middle ages were intertwined with their cultural backgrounds, primitive sciences were not able to become “universal” until they were integrated with mathematics, a feat accomplished by the West. In response to historians like Rupert Hall, who believed that Eastern science was of negligible influence on modern science, Needham argues that since modern science was a product of combining natural science and mathematics, both Eastern organic science and Western mechanical science should be given equal credit for the creation of modern science. In support of Needham’s sentiment, Marta E. Hanson states that Western science was not able to replicate China’s millennia old ceramic and porcelain production techniques up until the publication of Georges Vogt’s scientific analysis of Chinese porcelain in 1900.

Needham’s grand questions influenced other scholars to document the impact of non-European cultures on the development of modern science. Scholars such as Arun Bala have praised Science and Civilisation in China as the most comprehensive modern survey of the scientific and technological accomplishments of any non-European civilization. Needham’s work helped motivate the publication of more works that documented the influences of multicultural contributions on the development of modern science in its nascent stages, including Science and Civilization in Islam by Seyyed Hossien Nasr.
