= Lu Gwei-djen =

Chinese biochemist and historian (1904–1991)

- 魯桂珍
- Born: July 22, 1904; Nanjing, Jiangsu, Qing China
- Died: November 28, 1991 (aged 87)
- Education: Ginling College; University of Cambridge
- Occupations: Academic, Biochemist, Historian of science and technology in China
- Employer(s): St. John's University, Shanghai; University of California, Berkeley; International Cancer Research Foundation; UNESCO
- Spouse: Joseph Needham (m. 1989)

Lu Gwei-djen (Chinese: 魯桂珍; pinyin: Lǔ Guìzhēn; Wade–Giles: Lu Kui-chen; July 22, 1904 – November 28, 1991) was a Chinese biochemist and historian. She was an expert on the history of science and technology in China and a researcher of nutriology. She was an important researcher and co-author of the project Science and Civilisation in China led by Joseph Needham.

== Early life ==
Lu was born on July 22, 1904 in Nanjing, Jiangsu, Qing China. Her father was a pharmacist, with knowledge of both Chinese and Western herbal remedies. She was educated in science at Ginling College in Nanjing.

== Career ==
Lu began her distinguished career teaching biochemistry at the Women's Medical College in Shanghai between 1928 and 1930, then moved to teach at the medical school at St. John's University, Shanghai, between 1930 and 1933. She then took up a post as research assistant at the Henry Lester Institute for Medical Research, Shanghai, from 1933 to 1937.

In 1938, Lu came to the UK for a year's postgraduate study at the University of Cambridge under Dorothy M. Needham, as a research student at Newnham College.

In 1939, during World War II, Lu took up a post as research fellow at the Institute of Experimental Biochemistry, University of California, Berkeley, and at the Harriman Research Lab, San Francisco, from 1939 to 1941. She moved to the Hillman Hospital, Birmingham, Alabama, from 1941 to 1942, and then to the International Cancer Research Foundation, Philadelphia, Pennsylvania, from 1942 to 1945.

In 1945, Lu joined the Needhams in Chongqing as a consultant for nutrition at the Co-operation office and in 1948, moved to Paris, France, to work at UNESCO at the secretariat for natural sciences.

From 1957 onwards, Lu was a research fellow of the Wellcome Medical Foundation, working with Dr Joseph Needham in Cambridge on the "Science & Civilisation in China" project.

Lu was a Foundation Fellow of Lucy Cavendish College, Cambridge.

== Works ==
Among the work on which she is credited as co-author are:

- Lu Gwei-djen & Needham, Joseph (1980). Celestial Lancets: A History and Rationale of Acupuncture and Moxa. Cambridge; New York: Cambridge University Press.
- Needham, Joseph; Wang Ling & Lu Gwei-djen (1971). Civil Engineering and Nautics. Science and Civilisation in China. Vol. IV.3. Cambridge: Cambridge University Press. ISBN 0-521-07060-0.
- Needham, Joseph & Lu Gwei-djen (1983). Spagyrical discovery and invention : Physiological alchemy. Science and Civilisation in China. Vol. V.5. Cambridge: Cambridge University Press. ISBN 9780521085748.
- Needham, Joseph; Lu Gwei-djen; Combridge, John H. & Major, John S. (1986). The Hall of Heavenly Records: Korean Astronomical Instruments and Clocks, 1380-1780. Cambridge: Cambridge University Press. ISBN 978-0521616980.
- Lu Gwei-Djen & Needham, Joseph (1951). "A contribution to the history of Chinese dietetics". Isis. 42 (1): 13–20. doi:10.1086/349229. JSTOR 226660. PMID 14831972. S2CID 10054102.

== Legacy ==
The Lu Gwei-Djen Prize for the History of Science awarded by Gonville and Caius College, Cambridge is named in her honour as is the Lu Gwei Djen Research Fellowship awarded by Lucy Cavendish College, Cambridge - a position previously held by biophysicist Dr Eileen Nugent.

== Personal life ==
The daughter of a pharmacist, she was well known as Needham's long-time collaborator, co-author, Chinese language teacher and his second wife.

== Additional sources ==
- Winchester, Simon (2008). The Man Who Loved China: The Fantastic Story of the Eccentric Scientist Who Unlocked the Mysteries of the Middle Kingdom. New York: HarperCollins. ISBN 978-0-06-088459-8. Also published as Gun, Book and Compass.
- Wang Guozhong (1999). 魯桂珍與李約瑟 [Lu Guizhen yu Li Yuese (Lu Guizhen and Joseph Needham)]. Guiyang: Guizhou People's Press. pp. 1–29, 231–236. ISBN 7-221-04546-1.
