= Society for Anglo-Chinese Understanding =

UK nonprofit organization

- Abbreviation: SACU
- Formation: 1965; 61 years ago
- Founder: Joseph Needham; Joan Robinson; Derek Bryan
- Type: Charitable organisation
- Registration no.: 294651
- Purpose: Promote understanding and friendship between British and Chinese people
- President: Michael Wood
- Website: sacu.org

The Society for Anglo-Chinese Understanding (SACU) is an organisation established in 1965 to promote understanding and friendship between British and Chinese people. The organisation has no political affiliation and is open to all who are interested in China and its peoples. It is a registered charity and currently operates with branches in different parts of the country. In the 1970s SACU offered a rare point of contact with the PRC authorities: it provided information at a time when there were few other sources available and was one of the few organisations that could arrange visits. The organisation's first chairman and president was the much esteemed scientist and sinologist, Joseph Needham, FRS, Fellow and President of Gonville and Caius College, Cambridge.

== History ==
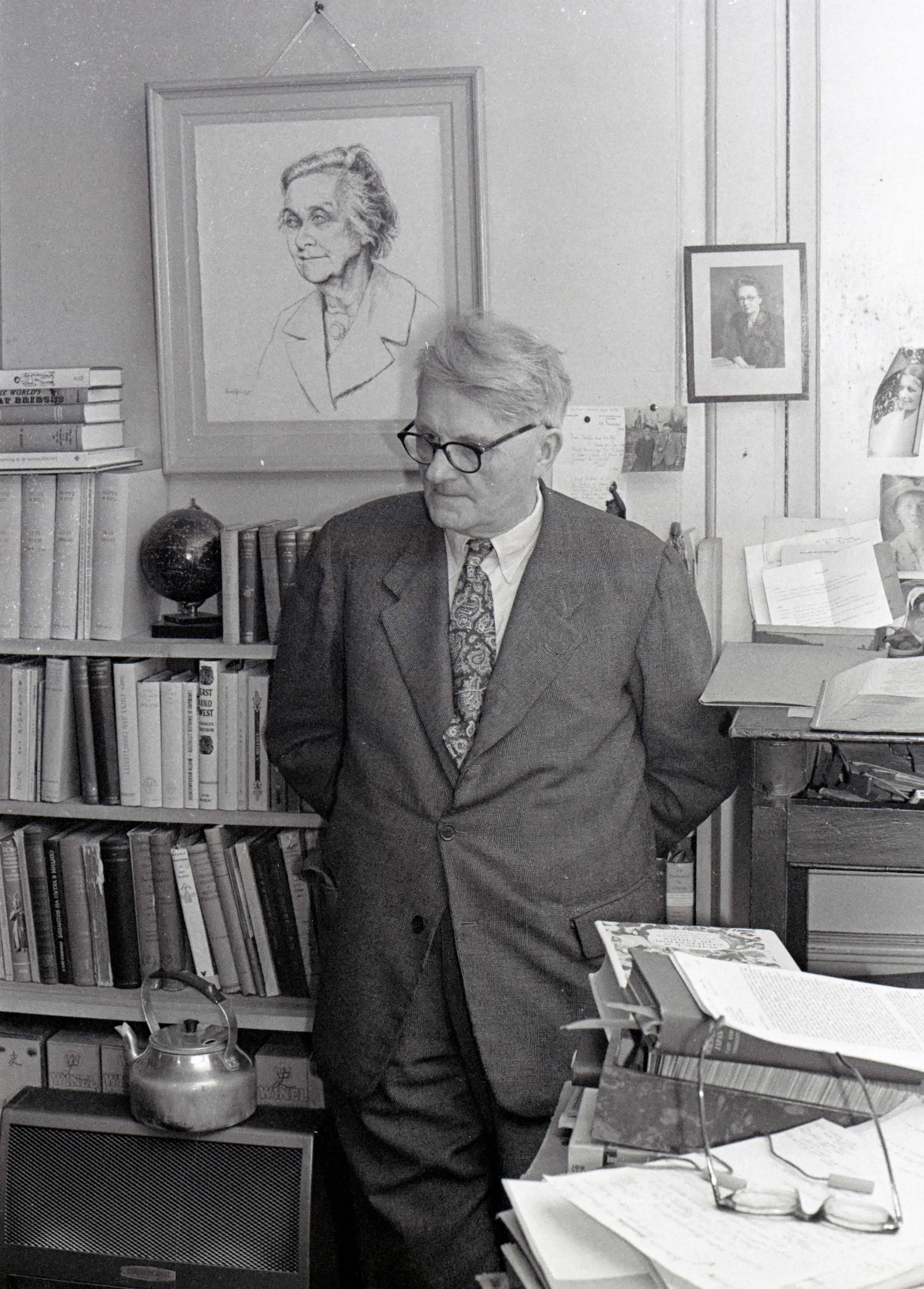
Joseph Needham, SACU's first chairman and president, pictured in 1965

SACU set out to inform the British public about China at a time when the country was internationally isolated, not recognised by the US and involved in a deepening split with the Soviet Union. Whilst the British government had opened diplomatic relations with the People's Republic of China in 1954, it supported the United States in its opposition to China's membership of the United Nations.

For SACU's founder members, it was 'a necessary condition of our understanding of world affairs that we make known the Chinese point of view on all kinds of matters, political as well as cultural'

Since 1949, the Britain-China Friendship Association (BCFA) had provided information to the UK public about politics in China. The organisation had close ties to the Communist Party of Great Britain. During the Sino-Soviet dispute of the early 1960s, Needham felt that the BCFA was failing to put across the Chinese view. He resigned from the presidency to seek to form a new organisation. He was joined by other leading BCFA members, Joan Robinson, Professor of Economics at Cambridge, Derek Bryan, former British diplomat, businessmen who had been involved in the 'Ice Breaker's Mission' to open trade with China in the 1950s.

They sought to establish a more broadly based movement to foster friendship with China not only in political but also cultural and academic circles. They gained support from over 200 prestigious sponsors from the arts, sciences, universities and public life, including eight MPs from all three parties, notably Jeremy Thorpe and Andrew Faulds, co-founder of the Great Britain China Parliamentary group in 1968; five bishops and other leading religious figures; and from the trade unions, Ernie Roberts, Assistant General Secretary of the AEU. SACU 'tapped into a deep well of interest in Chinese culture and sympathy for China's international isolation that extended beyond the British Left'. In a letter announcing its inauguration, Trevor-Roper, together with historian Arnold J. Toynbee and composer Benjamin Britten, said "This society is being formed to foster mutual comprehension between Britain and China in many different fields."

On 15 May 1965 the Society for Anglo-Chinese Understanding held its inaugural meeting at Church House, Westminster, which was attended by more than 1,000 people. Needham, the organisation's first chairman and president, gave an address. His main point was that the British and Chinese must come to know each other better. However, since China is not simply a different country but a basically different civilisation this requires a 'genuine effort towards understanding'. Having a friendly frame of mind to start with, he said, was 'essential to the objective of getting to know China better and the achievement of this would be a great contribution to the development of world peace and international comprehension'.

=== 1965 to 1980 ===
According to SACU's founding secretary, former British diplomat, Derek Bryan, while the launching was a great occasion, it was "not easy to keep on course". Soon after SACU was set up, with the escalation of the Vietnam War, the international situation deteriorated, and at the same time the Cultural Revolution was launched. These developments placed great strain on the organisation. The historian, Hugh Trevor-Roper, a prominent founder member, resigned in June 1966 after he was criticised by members for launching an attack on the Cultural Revolution in The Sunday Times headlined ‘The sick mind of China’.

Despite stormy beginnings, as Bryan reports, SACU's "...achievements were both more numerous and more significant". Almost all the main activities of the society were started in the first year, including public meetings, film shows, discussion meetings, Chinese language classes, a speakers panel and information service, a trade union committee and branches around the country. A regular newsletter, SACU News, published first hand reports of the Red Guard rallies. The Anglo-Chinese Education Institute (ACEI) was set up to establish a library, publish background booklets and organise weekend schools.

With Britain's relations with China reaching a low ebb and suspicion and hostility towards China very widespread, SACU shifted in 1967 towards a more committed political position to ‘champion China’s case openly’ and to ’counter propaganda, distortion and misrepresentation in the press aimed at conditioning people’s minds to an image of China as a global menace’. Many of the organisation's high-profile sponsors fell away but membership grew as SACU attracted young people opposed to the Vietnam War and with an interest in China's ‘socialist road’ and Mao Zedong thought.

SACU's magazine, China Now, first appeared in May 1970 aimed at providing more in depth discussion of developments for a Western audience. SACU Tours got underway in the same year, offering the only way British people to see the PRC with their own eyes.

By the early 1970s, with SACU becoming more established, the Foreign Office expressed concern that the organisation was ‘gaining ground’. Following the improvement in Sino-British relations after 1972, the Foreign Office proceeded to sponsor and directly fund the Great Britain China Centre to ‘act as an umbrella organisation bringing together the various unofficial bodies’. SACU pointedly was not invited to join the centre's executive committee.

Nevertheless, as the only national organisation in Britain concerned to offer a forum for discussion about the rapid and often confusing developments and policy changes during the last years of the Cultural Revolution and the transition to reform in the 1980s, SACU continued to attract members. The opening of China generated a wider public interest and SACU, through its links with the Chinese People's Association for Friendship with Foreign Countries, was able to expand tours, forming its own professional tour company. By 1985, SACU claimed to have had over 10,000 members at one time or another. Guardian journalist, John Gittings, David Attenborough, Iris Murdoch all visited China through SACU. Peter Hain and Chris Mullin, later to become Labour MPs, both made contributions to China Now.

During the Cultural Revolution years, SACU was to be dismissed by critics as being ‘uncritically Maoist’. Derek Bryan was later to admit that during this period ‘we were sometimes misled’. Nevertheless, in its first 25 years of existence SACU could claim to have played an important role in stimulating interest in and providing regular information about China and the Chinese people. "China Now" ran to 155 issues, providing in-depth discussion; the ACEI library collected over 3,000 books, and numerous press clippings; SACU branches were active in promoting town twinning, for example, in Cheltenham and Birmingham, and in developing links with the local Chinese communities; and SACU's educationalists group developed class room materials and supported schools links. It is in part owing to SACU's legacy that Chinese cultural and other events are today part of the fabric of life in cities and communities across Britain.

=== 1980 to present day ===
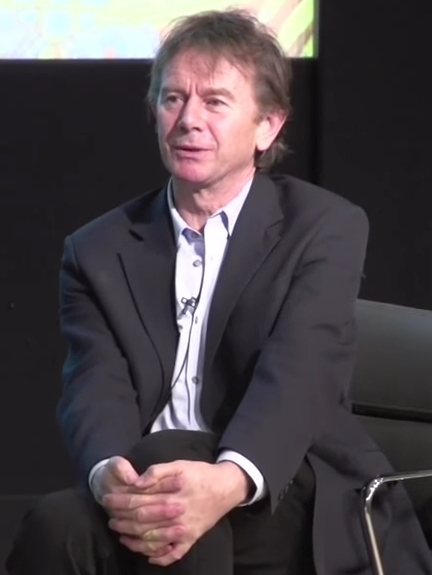
Michael Wood, SACU's president since January 2020

By the end of the 1980s, SACU tours faced increasing competition from the major commercial tour companies and other organisations and institutions now began to put on their own Chinese cultural activities. Difficulties were compounded by disagreements over the purposes of an organisation promoting friendly understanding with China following the suppression of the pro-democracy demonstrations in Tiananmen Square in 1989 and the membership started to decline.

Following a successful event to celebrate its 50th anniversary in 2015, SACU has embarked on a new period of activism with a series of events including two major panels - on the BRICS (Brazil, Russia, India, China and South Africa) in 2016 and on the Belt and Road Initiative in 2017.

SACU has extended its presence in the UK through a variety of partnerships and with activities in Cambridge, Manchester and Humberside as well as London. At the same time, it has developed links with local organisations in China. In particular, SACU has set up an Education Fund to assist in the vocational training of people in co-operative business methods in rural North West China. The fund is in memory of George Hogg, headmaster of the Bailie School In Shandan, Gansu province, who died there aged 30 in 1945.

SACU's growing membership continues to benefit from the regular production of China Eye with its varied content, in-depth articles and useful book reviews, and are kept in touch with the Chinese world in Britain by the popular monthly SACU newsletter.

As of 2020, Michael Wood is its president.

== Activities ==
SACU remains today a smaller, more focussed organisation but with a growing membership. It remains reliant on volunteers who share an interest in China and continue to pursue the basic aims of the organisation through public meetings and branch activities . China Now was succeeded by China in Focus (1996 – 2003) and China Eye (2004 to present).

== See also ==
- 48 Group Club
