= Ho Peng Yoke =

Malaya-born historian of Chinese science (1926–2014)

Ho Peng Yoke 何丙郁, born 4 April 1926 in Kinta Valley, died 18 October 2014 in Brisbane, was a Malaya-born historian of Chinese science, whose work in Australia, the UK, and Hong Kong contributed greatly to its understanding in Anglophone academia.

Ho Tih Ann was a soldier from Guangdong affiliated with Chen Jiongming who moved out of China to establish a school where he taught Chinese classics. The elder Ho sent his son to an English-speaking school. Ho Peng Yoke entered Raffles College and earned a degree in physics from the University of Malaya under Norman Alexander, then pursued a Master of Science in meteorology until Alexander left Singapore. Ho later completed a PhD via external examination, advised by Joseph Needham and Willy Hartner.

After a distinguished career at Griffith University, where he was Chairman (1973–78) and Foundation Professor of the School of Modern Asian Studies, he became the director of the Needham Research Institute from 1990 to 2001. He was a Fellow of the Australian Academy of the Humanities and an Academician of Academia Sinica.

== Selected bibliography ==
- The Astronomical Chapters of the Jin Shu, Mouton & Co, 1966.
- with F. P. Lisowski, Concepts of Chinese Science and Traditional Healing Arts: A Historical Overview, World Scientific, 1993, 100 pages ISBN 9810214960
- with F. P. Lisowski, A Brief History of Chinese Medicine and Its Influence, World Scientific, 1999, 124 pages ISBN 9810228031
- Li, Qi and Shu: An Introduction to Science and Civilization in China, Dover Publications, 2000, 272 pages ISBN 0486414450
- Chinese Mathematical Astrology: Reaching out for the stars, RoutledgeCurzon, 2003, 232 pages ISBN 0415297591
- Reminiscence of a Roving Scholar, (autobiography), World Scientific, 2005, 252 pages ISBN 9812565884

11 articles in Encyclopaedia of the History of Science, Technology, and Medicine in Non-Western Cultures.
