= Nathan Sivin =

American sinologist and historian of Chinese science (1931–2022)

Nathan Sivin (11 May 1931 – 24 June 2022), also known as Xiwen (Chinese: 席文), was an American sinologist, historian, essayist, educator, and writer. He taught first at Massachusetts Institute of Technology, then at the University of Pennsylvania until his retirement in 2006.

The major areas of study and focus in Nathan Sivin's career and publications were history of science and technology in China, medicine in traditional China, Chinese philosophy, and Chinese religious beliefs. He was a key player in the development of their scholarly study in the West. He collaborated with prominent scholars, such as G.E.R. Lloyd, A.C. Graham and Joseph Needham, and nurtured younger ones.

His wife was the artist Carole Delmore Sivin, who died in 2020. For many years they lived in Chestnut Hill, Pennsylvania.

In 1977 he was elected to the American Academy of Arts & Sciences. He was president of the Philadelphia literary society, Franklin Inn Club, 1996–1998.

== Education and career ==
From 1954 until 1956, Sivin was enrolled in an 18-month language program for Chinese at the U.S. Army Language School. He then went on to receive his Bachelor of Science degree in humanities with a chemistry minor at the Massachusetts Institute of Technology in 1958. He received his A.M. in the history of science at Harvard University in 1960, and his Ph.D. in the history of science at Harvard University in 1966. He received an honorary M.A. at the University of Pennsylvania.

In 1966, at MIT, Nathan Sivin served as an assistant professor of humanities, associate professor in 1969, and professor from 1972 until 1977, where he then moved to the University of Pennsylvania as a professor of Chinese culture and history of science.

Sivin studied abroad on many occasions. From October 1961 to August 1962 he studied Chinese language and philosophy in Taipei, Taiwan. From August 1962 to March 1963 he studied the history of Chinese alchemy in Singapore and provided guest lectures there. From the 1960s until the 1980s he was an avid visitor to Kyoto, Japan, where he acted as a visiting professor, studied at the Research Institute of Humanistic Studies, and studied Chinese astronomy, alchemy, and medicine. From 1974 to 2000 he made numerous trips to Cambridge in order to study Chinese astronomy, visiting Gonville and Caius College, the Needham Research Institute, and St. John's College in the process. From the late 1970s until the late 1990s he traveled several times to the People's Republic of China. In September 1979 he lectured in seminars at the École Pratique des Hautes Etudes of Paris, France, and at the Sinologisches Seminar at the University of Würzburg in Germany in 1981. Sivin also spoke several foreign languages, including Mandarin, Japanese, German, and French.

Along with various responsibilities at the University of Pennsylvania, throughout his career Sivin was also an elective member of numerous societies and committees. This included the American Society for the Study of Religion, the Philomathean Society, the Académie Internationale d'Histoire des Sciences, the T'ang Studies Society, and many others.

In 2010, his volume Granting the Seasons: The Chinese Astronomical Reform of 1280 was the first recipient of the Osterbrock Book Prize, awarded by the American Astronomical Society. "I am not a historian of astronomy," he told the committee, "but a generalist who has investigated all of the Chinese sciences and every period of Chinese history." He began work on the project in the 1970s, and was impressed that the large scale and lavish funding from the thirteenth century Chinese government were remarkable compared to the limited support for mathematical astronomy in Europe before modern times.

Along with numerous book publications, articles, chapters, and edited volumes, Sivin gave over 200 lectures throughout Europe, Asia, Australia, and North America.

In his last years he was working on several projects, including a biography on the Song dynasty polymath scientist Shen Kuo and a translation into English of a Yuan dynasty calendrical treatise published in 1279 AD, the Season-Granting (a hallmark of Chinese mathematical astronomy).

== Selected works ==
In a statistical overview derived from writings by and about Nathan Sivin, OCLC/WorldCat encompasses roughly 50 works in 80+ publications in 7 languages and 4,000+ library holdings.

- 1968. Chinese Alchemy: Preliminary Studies. Harvard Monographs in the History of Science, 1. Cambridge, MA: Harvard University Press. Chinese translation, Taipei: National Translation Bureau, 1973.
- 1969. Cosmos and Computation in Early Chinese Mathematical Astronomy. Leiden: E. J. Brill. Separate book version of 1969 essay (see below).
- 1973. Chinese Science: Explorations of an Ancient Tradition. MIT East Asian Science Series, 2. Edited by Shigeru Nakayama & N.S. Cambridge, MA: MIT Press. Includes an introduction and three articles by N.S., listed below.
- 1977. Science and Technology in East Asia. Articles from Isis, 1913–1975. Selected and edited by N.S. New York: Science History Publications. Includes an introduction and an article by N.S., listed below.
- 1979. Astronomy in Contemporary China. A Trip Report of the American Astronomy Delegation. By ten members of the Delegation. CSCPRC Reports, 7. Washington, DC: National Academy of Sciences. Includes several contributions by N.S., including a chapter on the history of astronomy.
- 1980. Science and Civilisation in China. Vol. 5, Part 4. Chemical Discovery. By Joseph Needham, Lu Gwei-djen, Ho Ping-yu, & N.S. Cambridge, England: At the University Press. Includes a section by N.S. on the theoretical background of laboratory alchemy.
- 1984. Chūgoku no Kopernikusu (Copernicus in China), trans. Nakayama Shigeru & Ushiyama Teruyo 牛山輝代. Selected essays by N.S., 1. Tokyo: Shisakusha.
- 1985. Chūgoku no renkinjutsu to ijutsu (Chinese alchemy and medicine), trans. Nakayama & Ushiyama. Idem, 2.
- 1987. Traditional Medicine in Contemporary China. A Partial Translation of Revised Outline of Chinese Medicine (1972) with an Introductory Study on Change in Present-day and Early Medicine. Science, Medicine and Technology in East Asia, 2. Ann Arbor: University of Michigan, Center for Chinese Studies.
- 1988. Contemporary Atlas of China. Boston: Houghton Mifflin. Consulting Editor. German translation: Bildatlas China. München: Südwest, 1989.
- 1989. Science and Medicine in Twentieth-Century China: Research and Education, ed. John Z. Bowers, William J. Hess, & N.S. Science, Medicine, and Technology in East Asia, 3. Ann Arbor: Center for Chinese Studies, University of Michigan.
- 1995. Science in Ancient China. Researches and Reflections. Variorum Collected Studies Series. Aldershot, Hants: Variorum.
- 1995. Medicine, Philosophy and Religion in Ancient China. Researches and Reflections. Variorum Collected Studies Series. Idem.
- 1996. History of Humanity. Scientific and Cultural Development. Vol. III. From the Seventh Century BC to the Seventh Century AD, ed. J. Herrmann & E. Zürcher. Paris: UNESCO. Integrated contributions on science, medicine, and technology.
- 2000. Science and Civilisation in China. Vol. 6, pt. 6. Medicine. Edited and with an Introduction by N.S. Cambridge University Press.
- 2002. The Way and the Word. Science and Medicine in Early Greece and China (with Sir Geoffrey Lloyd). Yale University Press.
- Sivin, Nathan. 2005. “A Multi-dimensional Approach to Research on Ancient Science”. East Asian Science, Technology, and Medicine, no. 23. Temporary Publisher: 10–25. https://www.jstor.org/stable/43150669.
- 2008. Granting the Seasons: The Chinese Astronomical Reform of 1280, With a Study of Its Many Dimensions and A Translation of Its Records. Springer.

== See also ==
- List of Sinologists
- List of American authors
- List of historians
- History of China
- Technology of the Song dynasty

== References and further reading ==
- Hanson, Marta; Smith, Hilary; Nylan, Michael (2023). "Eloge: Nathan Sivin (1931-2022)". Isis. 114 (1): 182–186. doi:10.1086/723498. S2CID 257051265.
- Nakayama, Shigeru (1995), "Working with Nathan Sivin: Four Decades", East Asian Science, Technology, and Medicine, 12 (1): 6–9, doi:10.1163/26669323-01201004, S2CID 164449074
- Rosemont, Henry (2008), "Nathan Sivin: A Man for All Seasons", Asia Major, 21 (1): 1–14, JSTOR 4164993.
- "Star Gazing, Firephasing, And Healing In China: Essays In Honor Of Nathan Sivin", Asia Major, 21 (1), 2009 A festschrift including essays by Anthony C. Yu, Roger T. Ames, G.E.R. Lloyd, Michael Nylan, John S. Major, Sarah A. Queen, and Marta E. Hanson.
