= Derek Bryan =

Herman Derek Bryan OBE (16 December 1910 – 17 September 2003) was a consular official, diplomat, sinologist, lecturer, writer, translator and editor.

== Education ==
Derek Bryan was the son of a well-established dentist in Norwich, Herman Bryan, the other children being three sisters. After attending Gresham's School, Holt, from 1924 to 1929, he went up to Sidney Sussex College, Cambridge. His lifelong diffidence regarding scholarly pursuits was already evident, but he finally settled on modern languages for his degree. At both Gresham's and Cambridge he was acquainted with Donald Maclean; one story he liked to tell was of looking up Maclean at the Foreign Office when later on home leave from China, with Maclean emerging to declare, "We have lost Franco."

== Career ==
After Cambridge, Bryan was again uncertain what to do, but was steered in the direction of taking the examinations for the Open Competition for the Civil Service. As he liked to tell it, he passed just high enough to be offered the last post going, a student-interpretership in the China branch of the Consular Service. Sailing for China in December 1932, a week before turning twenty-two, an active career followed taking in postings in various parts of China, including Macao during part of the Japanese incursion. He acted as private secretary to the British Ambassador, Sir Archibald Clark-Kerr on a second posting in Chongqing in 1941, rising to be Chinese Secretary in the British Embassy in Peking.

He was a fluent linguist and made many friends in progressive Chinese circles. In the summer of 1936, when first posted in Chongqing, he joined a memorable walking expedition in Western Sichuan towards the Tibetan border in the company of Julian Bell, Yeh Chun Chan (Ye Junjian) and the geologist J. B. (Jack) Hanson-Lowe (who made a more extensive exploration of the region the following year). In 1943, he married Liao Hong-Ying (1905–1998), who was then working for the British Council in China. Liao had read chemistry at Somerville College, Oxford, coming into close contact with Dorothy Crowfoot (Dorothy Hodgkin). Joseph Needham, then serving as British Scientific Adviser in China, recommended Bryan to Liao when she was due to visit Lanzhou where Bryan was consul. In the 1950s, Bryan and Liao were to accompany a delegation including Dorothy Hodgkin on, at that period, a rare visit to the People's Republic of China.

It was also through Liao that Bryan came to be increasingly involved with the Quakers; his administrative experience was especially appreciated by the Quaker Meeting in Norwich and he served a term as co-clerk of the Meeting. Bryan had, however, grown up in the Church of England, retaining a special affection for Norwich Cathedral. On finally moving back to Norwich, he was able to find expression for this again, together with an engagement with the St. Julian's Church, which was only a short distance from the Bryans' home on Southgate Lane. For Liao, it had been a visit to Jordans, coupled with the personal support of Margery Fry, who, as Principal, had admitted her to Somerville, that had first drawn her to the Quakers. The Bryans were married in Chengdu after the Quaker custom and stayed with Margery Fry on their first return as a couple from China.

As Chinese Secretary, he helped to resolve the Yangtse Incident of April 1949, when the British warship HMS Amethyst was caught off-guard on Yangtze River behind the rapidly advancing lines of the People's Liberation Army. While his assistant, Edward Youde, later to serve as Governor of Hong Kong, achieved popular recognition for cycling behind those lines to make contact with the Amethyst, it was Bryan who was sent to take a lecture on gun-boat diplomacy from Huang Hua.

Bryan was never a communist and would chuckle in recalling the blandishments of those who had encouraged him to join the Communist Party, only themselves to fall away, especially after 1956. Nevertheless, he was candid in his sympathies for the Chinese in the circumstances China faced, reflecting the practicality of the consular official, rather than the valiant discretion of the diplomat. While serving as the British Consul in Peking, he called for the admission of the People's Republic to the United Nations a generation before the Americans stopped vetoing it, and in 1951, during the Korean War, he said he approved of Mao's social reforms. Although Bryan had served in China almost continuously for eighteen years and was then the Foreign Office's most able sinologue, the early 1950s were a period of heightened political sensitivity and it was decided to offer Bryan the post of Commercial Attaché in Lima, Peru. Bryan activated the early retirement provision, largely out of consideration for his wife. The move accelerated the careers of younger colleagues such as Youde, but also left confusion in the minds of those not familiar with the full story, clouding Bryan's standing with some (such as Youde's predecessor as Governor of Hong Kong, Murray MacLehose).

Bryan's initial plans, again reflecting his wife's inclinations, were to undertake research on Chinese literature back at Cambridge. But, chaffing again with scholarship, perhaps more particularly with his chosen topic, the writer Lu Xun, he turned to more active organisational work, for instance, playing a leading role in the Britain-China Friendship Association. With Joseph Needham, who was by now concentrating on the history Chinese science, he established the Society for Anglo-Chinese Understanding (SACU), which for some years provided the only way for the British to visit the People's Republic.

Bryan and Liao also took to spending alternating periods in the UK and the PRC. In 1963, he began to teach Chinese at Holborn College, later part of the University of Westminster. In 1974 he founded a degree course in modern Chinese there. Their base in China was in Chengdu. Bryan retired in 1978, moving back to Norwich, his birthplace, from 1988. Bryan and Liao were often joined in Norwich by her biographer, Innes Herdan (née Jackson; note also Chiang Yee), who had been with Liao at Wuhan University after their studies at Somerville College; Herdan continued this association with Bryan after Liao's death.

Bryan developed conflicting health problems after a long-haul flight from Hong Kong on returning from being a guest in Peking for the fiftieth anniversary in 1999 of the establishment of the PRC. He suffered a stroke in 2002, from which he never fully recovered. In his will, he funded scholarships for graduate students from China at the University of East Anglia, continuing the hospitality he and Liao had commenced on return to Norwich in having Chinese students stay with them for extended periods.

Under the guidance of Innes Herdan, the papers of Derek Bryan and Liao Hongying are now in the Special Collections library of the School of Oriental and African Studies, London (see the Archive Catalogue under PP MS 99). Bryan himself had intended all their books and papers to go to the Needham Research Institute, in Cambridge, honoring their close association, indeed their union on account of, Joseph Needham. Bryan was always somewhat inhibited in discussing his career, out of respect for the Official Secrets Act. Nevertheless, at the time of his death, Bryan had been working up an extended biographical sketch, based on his diaries kept in spidery handwriting in a series of little black notebooks. This work appears to have been mislaid or otherwise lost, in contrast to his own scrupulous orderliness with papers throughout his working life. The last years were truly a great trial to someone who, not hitherto having known illness, had always administered their affairs with executive dispatch.

== Editor ==
From 1963 to 1965, Bryan was the founding editor of Arts and Sciences in China, a journal of Chinese studies published in London. Among the members of the editorial board were J. D. Bernal, Sir William Empson, Joseph Needham, Sir Herbert Read and Arthur Waley

== Author ==
Bryan's published works include –

- The United Nations Need China (1958)
- China's Taiwan (Britain-China Friendship Association, London, 1959)
- The World Belongs to All (London, 1960, with Liao Hong Ying )
- Li-po Chou's Great Changes in a Mountain Village (translator) (Foreign Languages Press, Peking, 1961)
- The Land and People of China (Macmillan, London, 1964) ISBN 0-02-715110-7
- Cultural Restoration versus Cultural Revolution: A Traditional Cultural Perspective (Foreign Languages Press, Beijing, 1964)
- Let's Visit China (Macmillan Children's Books, 1983, with Liao Hong Ying)

== Honours ==
- Officer of the Order of the British Empire 1951

== Sources ==
- Antoniades, Irini Innes Herdan: obituary, The Guardian, 18 June 2008.
- Bryan, Derek Background to the formation of SACU in 1965, China Now, April 1975.
- Bryan, Derek Reflections on China, 1933–1999, China in Focus, Issue No. 8, 2000.
- Gittings, John Derek Bryan: Chinese scholar penalised for his candour, The Guardian, 3 October 2003.
