= Shigeru Nakayama =

Shigeru Nakayama (中山茂) (1928–2014) was a Japanese historian of science.

== Life ==
Nakayama was born in 1928, in Amagasaki, and brought up there. He survived the Hiroshima atom bomb of 1945. He left Hiroshima Higher School in 1948, and graduated from Tokyo University with a degree in mathematical astronomy in 1951.

As a graduate student, Nakayama was a Fulbright scholar. He worked with Thomas Kuhn and then Joseph Needham. Besides those two scholars, he regarded Kiyosi Yabuuti (1906–2000) as one of his teachers. At Harvard in the late 1950s, he met fellow graduate student Nathan Sivin, with whom he worked for many decades. Nakayama was on the staff of Tokyo University from 1960 to 1989. As Professor Emeritus, he was at Kanagawa University.

Nakayama died in Tokyo on Saturday 10 May 2014.

== Works ==
- Japanese Studies in the History of Astronomy (1962)
- A History of Japanese Astronomy: Chinese Background and Western Impact (1969)
- Characteristics of scientific development in Japan (1977)
- Academic and scientific traditions in China, Japan, and the West (1984)
- Science, Technology, and Society in Postwar Japan (1991)
- A Social History of Science and Technology in Contemporary Japan: The Occupation Period, 1945-1952 (2001), with Kunio Goto and Hitoshi Yoshioka
- A Social History of Science and Technology in Contemporary Japan: Road to Self-Reliance, 1952-1959 (2005), with Kunio Goto and Hitoshi Yoshioka
- A Social History of Science and Technology in Contemporary Japan: Transformation period, 1970-1979 (2006)
- The Orientation of Science and Technology: A Japanese View (2009)
