= Mei Jianjun =

- Education: Beijing University of Iron and Steel Technology, University of Cambridge
- Occupation: Archaeometallurgy
- Employer: Needham Research Institute

Mei Jianjun (梅建军) is an archaeo-metallurgist. As of January 2014, he became Director of the Needham Research Institute, as well as a Fellow of Churchill College, Cambridge University. He served as President of the International Society for the History of East Asian Science, Technology and Medicine (ISHEASTM) in 2015. His book Copper and bronze metallurgy in late prehistoric Xinjiang (2001) presented "significant new archaeological data" relating to the introduction and use of copper and bronze in Xinjiang province and neighboring areas.

== Education ==
Mei Jianjun is a graduate of the Beijing University of Iron and Steel Technology from which he received a B.Eng in Metallurgical Chemistry in 1984. In 1988, he received an M.Sc in the History of Science and Technology. In 1994, he became a Li Foundation scholar at the Needham Research Institute at the University of Cambridge. In 2000 he received his Ph.D. from the Department of Archaeology at Cambridge.

Mei then held postdoctoral fellowships at the McDonald Institute for Archaeological Research at the University of Cambridge (2000-2001), the Needham Research Institute (Andrew W. Mellon Foundation fellowship, 2003-2004), and the Tokyo National Museum (2001-2003).

== Career ==
In 2004, Mei became a Professor and Director of the Institute of Historical Metallurgy and Materials at the renamed University of Science and Technology Beijing. In 2014, Mei became director of the Needham Research Institute at Cambridge.

== Publications ==
=== Articles ===
- Mei, J.; Wang, P.; Chen, K.; Wang, L.; Wang, Y.; Liu, Y. (2015). "Archaeometallurgical studies in China: Some recent developments and challenging issues". Journal of Archaeological Science. 56: 221–232. doi:10.1016/j.jas.2015.02.026.
- (with Xu Jianwei, Chen Kunlong et al.), "Recent Research on Early Bronze Metallurgy in Northwest China", in Paul Jett (ed.), Scientific Research on Ancient Asian Metallurgy. Washington: Freer Gallery of Arts, 2012, pp. 37–46.
- (with Kunlong Chen and Wei Cao), "Scientific Examination of Shang-Dynasty Bronzes from Hanzhong, Shaanxi Province, China" in Journal of Archaeological Science, 36(9), 2009: 1881-1891.
- "Early Metallurgy and Socio-Cultural Complexity: Archaeological Discoveries in Northwest China", in Bryan K. Hanks and Katheryn M.Linduff (eds.), Social Complexity in Prehistoric Eurasia. Cambridge: Cambridge University Press, 2009, pp. 215–32.
- (with Kunlong Chen, Thilo Rehren, et al.), "Special Alloys from Remote Frontiers: Scientific Study of the Shang Bronzes from Hanzhong, Southwest Shaanxi", Journal of Archaeological Science, 36(10), 2009: 2108-2118.
- "The Material Culture of the Iron Age Peoples in Xinjiang, Northwest China", in Joan Aruz and Ann Farkas (eds), The Golden Deer of Eurasia. New York: The Metropolitan Museum of Art, 2006, pp. 132–145.
- (with Thilo Rehren), "Copper Smelting from Xinjiang, Northwest China, Part I: Kangcun village, Kuche County, c. 18th century AD", Historical Metallurgy, 39(2), 2005: 96-105.
- "Metallurgy in Bronze Age Xinjiang and its Cultural Context", in Katheryn M. Linduff (ed.), Metallurgy in Eastern Eurasia from the Urals to the Yellow River. Lewiston: The Edwin Mellen Press, 2004, pp. 173–88.
- "Qijia and Seima-Turbino: the Question of Early Contacts between Northwest China and the Eurasian Steppe". Bulletin of the Museum of Far Eastern Antiquities, 75 (2003): 31-54.
- "Cultural interaction between China and Central Asia during the Bronze Age. Proceedings of the British Academy, 121 (2003): 1-39.
- (with Colin Shell), "The Iron Age Cultures in Xinjiang and their Steppe Connections", in Katie Boyle et al. (eds.), Ancient Interactions: East and West in Eurasia. Cambridge: McDonald Institute for Archaeological Research, 2002, pp. 213–234.

=== Books ===
- Mei, Jianjun (2000). Copper and bronze metallurgy in late prehistoric Xinjiang : its cultural context and relationship with neighbouring regions. BAR International Series 865. Oxford: Archaeopress. ISBN 9781841710686.
- Mei, Jianjun; Rehren, Thilo, eds. (2009). Metallurgy and civilisation : Eurasia and beyond : proceedings of the 6th International Conference on the Beginnings of the Use of Metals and Alloys (BUMA VI). London: Archetype. ISBN 9781904982494.
