= Colin Ronan =

British author (1920–1995)

Colin Alistair Ronan
- Born: 4 June 1920; London, England
- Died: 1 June 1995 (aged 74)

Colin Alistair Ronan FRAS (4 June 1920, in London – 1 June 1995) was a British author and specialist in the history and philosophy of science.

== Education ==
Colin Alistair Ronan was educated at Abingdon School in Abingdon-on-Thames, Oxfordshire from 1934 to 1937.

== Military service ==
He served in the British Army from 1940 to 1946, achieving the rank of major.

== Career ==
After the war, he obtained a BSc in Astronomy and took an administrative post at the secretariat of The Royal Society. There, he did an MSc in the History and Philosophy of Science under Herbert Dingle at University College London.

After leaving the Royal Society he took up writing, and during a long career, he was an author produced over forty books, mainly on astronomy, and the history and philosophy of science. Later, he collaborated with Joseph Needham on an abridgement of Needham's great work on China, producing The Shorter Science and Civilisation in China in several volumes.

He was elected to the British Astronomical Association (BAA) on 26 January 1938. He went on to be Historical Section Director from 1953 to 1965, Journal Editor from 1965 to 1985, and President from 1989 to 1991, during which time the association celebrated its centenary. On the 12 February 1943 Ronan was elected to the fellowship of the Royal Astronomical Society.

In 1991, Ronan delivered a Presidential Address to the BAA in which he argued that Leonard Digges, father of Thomas Digges was the originator of the reflecting telescope sometime between 1540 and 1559, over a century before Isaac Newton, who is usually credited with having built the first such telescope around 1668.

For a period in the 1980s and early 1990s, he collaborated with Sir Patrick Moore in lecture tours. They took the form of weekend residential symposia on single topics such as the return of Halley's Comet.

With his second wife, Ann, he founded the Ronan Picture Library, which specialises in scientific and historical pictures. Among his many books on the history of science were studies of scientists such as Galileo, William Herschel and Edmond Halley. He also wrote scientific books for children, along with books such as The Practical Astronomer (1981), written for beginner amateur astronomers.

He was the Space Consultant on the puppet sci-fi TV series Space Patrol, created and written by Roberta Leigh in 1962. Ronan is listed in the end credits.

Ronan had an asteroid named in honour of his achievements: 4024 Ronan belongs to the Floras family, discovered by E. Bowell on 24 November 1981 at Anderson Mesa Station.

== Bibliography ==
- Universe: The Cosmos Explained. Quantum Books. 2007.
- The Universe Explained. Henry Holt, Thames and Hudson. 1994. ISBN 978-0-500-01632-9.
- Science Explained. Henry Holt. 1993. ISBN 978-0-8050-2551-4.
- The Natural History of the Universe. Transworld Publishers, Macmillan. 1991.
- Science: Its History & Development Among the World's Cultures. Facts on File. 1985.
- The Skywatcher's Handbook: Night and Day, what to look for in the Heavens above. Corgi, Crown. 1985.
- Amateur Astronomy-A Comprehensive & Practical Survey. Newnes Books. 1984.
- Science: Its History and Development among the World's Cultures. Facts on File. 1983.
- The Cambridge Illustrated History of the World's Science. Cambridge University Press. 1983.
- Atlas of Scientific Discovery. Crescent Books, Apple Press. 1983.
- Deep Space. Scribner. 1982.
- The Practical Astronomer. Macmillan, (Crescent 1988, Bloomsbury 1992). 1981.
- Encyclopedia of Astronomy. Hamlyn. 1979.
- The Shorter Science and Civilization in China (with Joseph Needham). Cambridge University Press in 5 volumes. 1978–1995.
- Greenwich Observatory: 300 years of astronomy. Times Books. 1975. Bibcode:1975grob.book.....R.
- Galileo. Weidenfeld & Nicolson, Putnam. 1974.
- Astronomy: Illustrated Sources in History. David and Charles, Barnes and Noble. 1973.
- Lost Discoveries: The Forgotten Science of the Ancient World. McGraw Hill. 1973.
- Discovering the Universe: A History of Astronomy. Basic Books 1971, Heinemann 1972. 1971.
- Book of Science. Oxford University Press. 1971.
- Sir Isaac Newton. International Textbook Company 1971, Shire 1976. 1971.
- Edmond Halley: Genius in Eclipse. Doubleday. 1969. Bibcode:1969ehge.book.....R.
- Astronomers Royal. Doubleday. 1969.
- Their Majesties' Astronomers. Bodley Head. 1967.
- Invisible Astronomy. Eyre and Spottiswood 1967, JB Lippincott Co 1972. 1967.
- The Meaning of Sound. Hart Publishing Company. 1967.
- The Ages of Science. George G Harrup Co. 1966.
- Exploring Space. Odhams Books Limited. 1966.
- The Easy Way to Understand Photography. Max Parrish. 1966.
- The Universe. Franklin Watts, NY, later OUP. 1966.
- The Stars (Natural Science Picture Books). McGraw Hill, Bodley Head Children's Books. 1965.
- Man Probes the Universe – The Story of Astronomy. Natural History Press. 1964.
- Optical Astronomy-Changing Horizons. Phoenix House, Roy Publishers. 1964. Bibcode:1964oach.book.....R.
- The Astronomers. Evans Brothers. 1964.
- Radio and Radar Astronomy. Doubleday. 1963.
- Clocks and Watches. Doubleday. 1962.
- The Meaning of Light. Weidenfeld & Nicolson. 1962.
- Changing Views of the Universe. Eyre and Spottiswood, Macmillan. 1961. Bibcode:1961cvu..book.....R.
- The Earth from Pole to Pole. George G Harrup Co. 1961.

== See also ==
- List of Old Abingdonians
