= A History of Embryology =

1934 book by Joseph Needham

History of Embryology
- Author: Joseph Needham
- Genre: Historical non-fiction
- Publisher: At the University Press
- Publication date: 1934
- Publication place: United Kingdom
- Media type: Print (hardback and paperback)
- Pages: 274 pp

A History of Embryology is a 1934 book about the history of embryology by the British biochemist, Joseph Needham. In 1959, a revised edition was published.

In 1931, Needham wrote a book called Chemical Embryology. The first four chapters were a detailed treatment of the history of embryology up until c. 1800. Several years later, these chapters grew into and were separately published as Needham's book A History of Embryology. The four chapters of Needham's book chronologically cover the development of embryology from ancient times until the late 18th century.

== Early stages ==
Needham starts with early stages of embryology in Egypt, Greece, and Rome. where the study was mostly speculative and based on observations from animal and human reproduction. noteworthy contributions of Aristotle's laid the groundwork for future developments.

== Middle Ages ==
During the Middle Ages, religious and philosophical beliefs notably influenced embryological theories which limited scientific progress. Although, the renaissance saw a shift as evidence by the work of Leonardo da Vinci and others, who introduce more systematic studies of anatomy and embryology.

== 17th and 18th centuries ==
In the 17th and 18th centuries the invention of the microscope allowed scientist like Marcello Malpighi and Jan Swammerdam to observe embryonic development which leading to the preformationist theory that the embryo exists fully formed within the egg or sperm. this theory was the challenges from atonable discoveries by Nicholas Stensen, William Harvey and others.

== 19th and 20th centuries ==
In the 19th and 20th centuries the influential work of Karl Ernst von Baer and the integration of genetics by Gregor Mendel laid the foundation for developmental biology. Needham concludes with discussions on stem cell research and the ethical and social implications of modern advancements.
