= Joseph Needham =

British biochemist, historian and sinologist (1900–1995)

Joseph Needham CH FRS FBA
- Born: Noel Joseph Terence Montgomery Needham; 9 December 1900; London, England
- Died: 24 March 1995 (aged 94); Cambridge, Cambridgeshire, England
- Education: Gonville and Caius College, Cambridge (BA, MA, PhD)
- Occupations: Biochemist, historian of science, sinologist
- Known for: Science and Civilisation in China
- Spouses: Dorothy Moyle Needham (m. 1924; died 1987) Lu Gwei-djen (m. 1989; died 1991)
- Awards: Leonardo da Vinci Medal (1968); Dexter Award (1979)

Chinese name
- Traditional Chinese: 李約瑟
- Simplified Chinese: 李约瑟
- Literal meaning: Li (surname 李) Joseph
Transcriptions
Standard Mandarin
- Hanyu Pinyin: Lǐ Yuēsè
- Wade–Giles: Li Yüeh-Sê

Noel Joseph Terence Montgomery Needham (/ˈniːdəm/; 9 December 1900 – 24 March 1995) was a British biochemist, historian of science and sinologist known for his scientific research and writing on the history of Chinese science and technology, initiating publication of the multivolume Science and Civilisation in China. He called attention to what has come to be known as the Needham Question, of why and how China had ceded its leadership in science and technology to Western countries.

He was elected a fellow of the Royal Society in 1941 and a fellow of the British Academy in 1971. In 1992, Queen Elizabeth II conferred on him the Order of the Companions of Honour, and the Royal Society noted he was the only living person to hold these three titles.

== Early life ==
Needham's father, Joseph, was a doctor, and his mother, Alicia Adelaïde, née Montgomery (1863–1945), was a music composer from Oldcastle, County Meath, Ireland. His father, born in East London, then a poor section of town, rose to become a Harley Street physician, but frequently battled with Needham's mother. The young Needham often mediated. In his early teens, he was taken to hear the Sunday lectures of Ernest Barnes, a professional mathematician who became Master of the Temple, a royal church in London. Barnes inspired an interest in the philosophers and medieval scholastics that Needham pursued in his father's library. Needham later attributed his strong Christian faith to Barnes' philosophical theology, which was founded on rational argument, and attributed his openness to the religions of other cultures to Barnes as well.

In 1914, with the outbreak of World War I, Needham was sent to Oundle School, founded in 1556 in Northamptonshire. He did not enjoy leaving home, but he later described the headmaster Frederick William Sanderson as a "man of genius" and said that without that influence on him at a tender age, he might not have attempted his largest work. Sanderson had been charged by the school's governors with developing a science and technology programme, which included a metal shop that gave the young Needham a grounding in engineering. Sanderson also emphasised to the boys of the school that co-operation led to higher human achievement than competition and that knowledge of history was necessary to build a better future. The Bible, in Sanderson's teaching, supplied archaeological knowledge to compare with the present. During school holidays, Needham assisted his father in the operating rooms of several wartime hospitals, an experience that convinced him that he was not interested in becoming a surgeon. The Royal Navy, however, appointed him a surgeon sub-lieutenant, a position that he held for only a few months.

== Education ==
In 1921, Needham graduated with a Bachelor of Arts degree from Gonville and Caius College, Cambridge. In January 1925, Needham earned an MA. In October 1925, Needham earned a PhD. He had intended to study medicine, but came under the influence of Frederick Hopkins, resulting in his switch to biochemistry.

== Career ==
After graduation, Needham was elected to a fellowship at Gonville and Caius College and worked in Gowland Hopkins' laboratory at the University Department of Biochemistry, specialising in embryology and morphogenesis. His three-volume work Chemical Embryology, published in 1931, included a classic study on the history of embryology stretching back from Egyptian times up to the early 19th century, and these chapters were later published under the title A History of Embryology in 1934. Including this history reflected Needham's fear that overspecialization would hold back scientific progress and that social and historical forces shaped science. At that time Cambridge school of biochemistry were recognised for imaginative exploratory science and had outstanding scientists Hopkins, Dorothy M. Needham (later his wife), Robin Hill, Barcroft who were joined by Rudi Lemberg on a Rockefeller Foundation fellowship.

In 1936, he and several other Cambridge scientists founded the History of Science Committee. The Committee included conservatives but also Marxists like J.D. Bernal, whose views on the social and economic frameworks of science influence Needham.

Needham's Terry Lecture of 1936 was published by Cambridge University Press in association with Yale University Press under the title of Order and Life. In 1939 he produced a massive work on morphogenesis that a Harvard reviewer claimed "will go down in the history of science as Joseph Needham's magnum opus," little knowing what would come later.

Although his career as biochemist and an academic was well established, his career developed in unanticipated directions with World War II with his evident interest in history. In 1939, Needham referred to his thesis that "man's intellectual progress cannot be understood save in the light of his social progress" illustrated by the historical period which saw the re-birth of experimental science in Europe and in England at the end of the seventeenth century. He was writing the foreword, with "particular pleasure", to the little book of my friend on the Levellers. Needham wrote: "Merton has shown how puritan were the early Fellows of the Royal Society." And goes on to acknowledge Holorenshaw in pointing out: "that no less than the men of property, the Levellers realised the social importance of science, and foresaw the part it would one day play in human welfare."

Three Chinese scientists came to Cambridge for graduate study in 1937: Lu Gwei-djen, Wang Ying-lai, and Shen Shih-Chang (沈詩章, the only one under Needham's tutelage). Lu, daughter of a Nanjing pharmacist, taught Needham Chinese, igniting his interest in China's ancient technological and scientific past. He then pursued, and mastered, the study of Classical Chinese privately with Gustav Haloun.

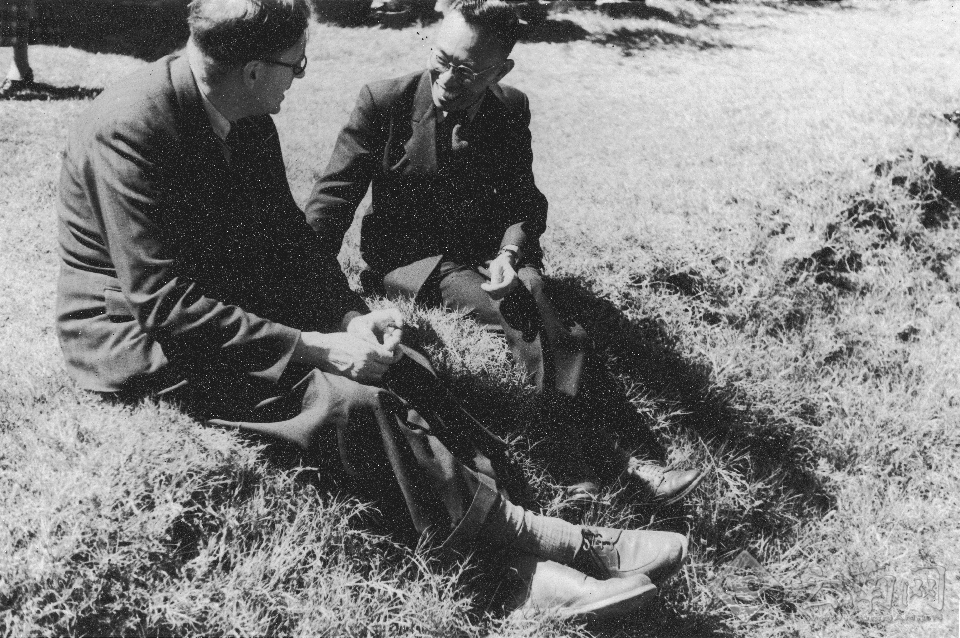
Tang Fei-fan and Joseph Needham in Kunming, Yunnan 1944

Under the Royal Society's direction, Needham was the director of the Sino-British Science Co-operation Office in Chongqing from 1942 to 1946. During this time he made several long journeys through war-torn China and many smaller ones, visiting scientific and educational establishments and obtaining for them much needed supplies. His longest trip in late 1943 ended in far west in Gansu at the caves in Dunhuang at the end of the Great Wall where the earliest dated printed book - a copy of the Diamond Sutra - was found. The other long trip reached Fuzhou on the east coast, returning across the Xiang River just two days before the Japanese blew up the bridge at Hengyang and cut off that part of China. In 1944 he visited Yunnan in an attempt to reach the Burmese border. Everywhere he went he purchased and was given old historical and scientific books which he shipped back to Britain through diplomatic channels. They were to form the foundation of his later research. He got to know Zhou Enlai, first Premier of the People's Republic of China, and met numerous Chinese scholars, including the painter Wu Zuoren, and the meteorologist Zhu Kezhen, who later sent crates of books to him in Cambridge, including 2,000 volumes of the Gujin Tushu Jicheng encyclopaedia, a comprehensive record of China's past.

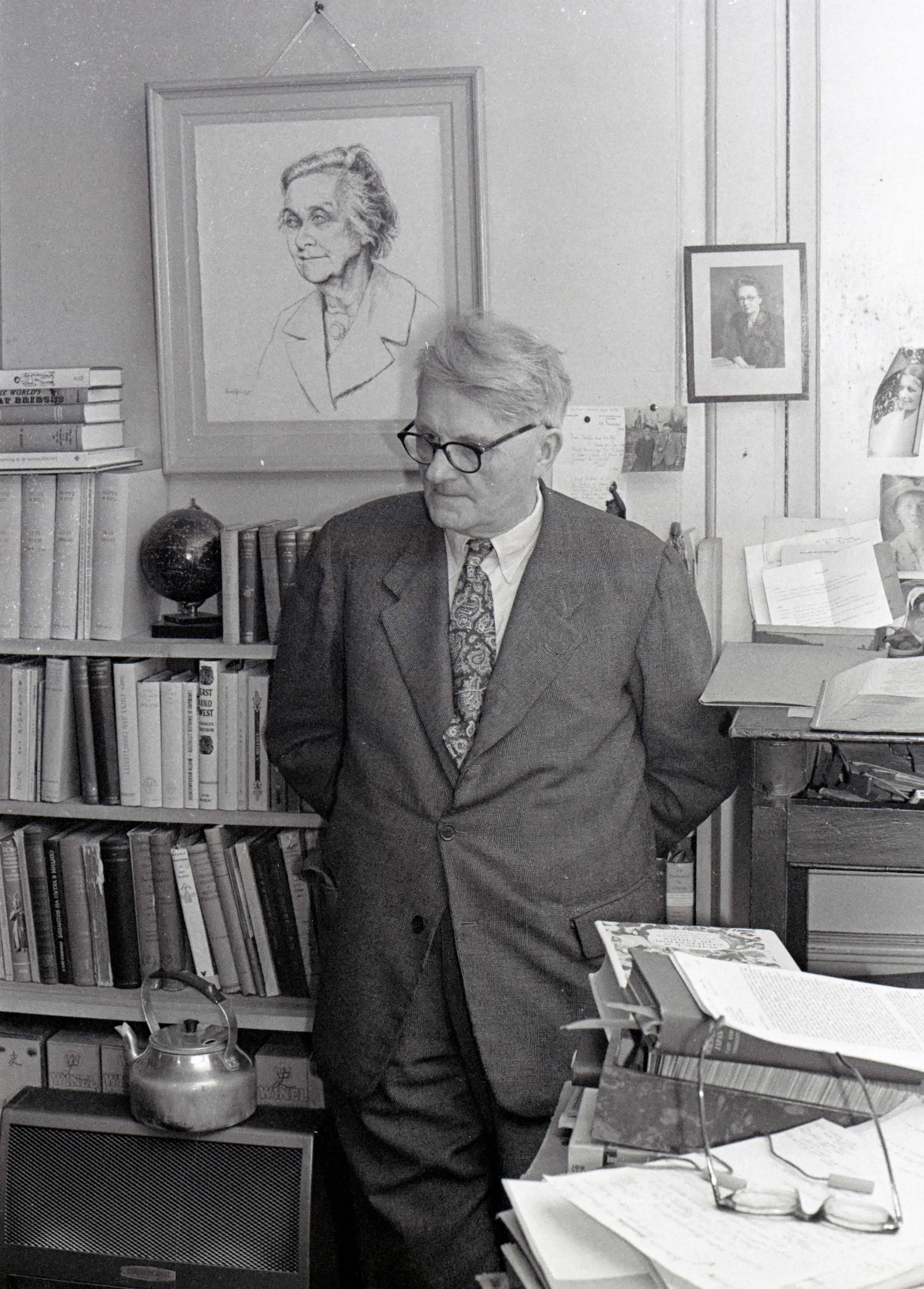
Joseph Needham in Cambridge 1965

On his return to Europe, he was asked by Julian Huxley to become the first head of the Natural Sciences Section of UNESCO in Paris. In fact it was Needham who insisted that science should be included in the organisation's mandate at an earlier planning meeting.

After two years in which the suspicions of the Americans over scientific co-operation with communists intensified, Needham resigned in 1948 and returned to Gonville and Caius College, where he resumed his fellowship and his rooms, which were soon filled with his books.

He devoted his energy to the history of Chinese science until his retirement in 1990, even though he continued to teach some biochemistry until 1993. Needham's reputation recovered from the Korean affair (see below) such that by 1959 he was elected as president of the fellows of Caius College and in 1965 he became Master (head) of the college, a post which he held until he was 76.

=== Science and Civilisation in China ===
In 1948, Needham proposed a project to the Cambridge University Press for a book on Science and Civilisation in China. Within weeks of being accepted, the project had grown to seven volumes, and it has expanded ever since. His initial collaborator was the historian Wang Ling, whom he had met in Lizhuang and obtained a position for at Trinity. The first years were devoted to compiling a list of every mechanical invention and abstract idea that had been made and conceived in China. These included cast iron, the ploughshare, the stirrup, gunpowder, printing, the magnetic compass and clockwork escapements, most of which were thought at the time to be western inventions. The first volume eventually appeared in 1954.

The publication received widespread acclaim, which intensified to lyricism as the further volumes appeared. He wrote fifteen volumes himself, and the regular production of further volumes continued after his death in 1995. Later, Volume III was divided, so that 27 volumes have now been published. Successive volumes are published as they are completed, which means that they do not appear in the order originally contemplated in the project's prospectus.

Needham's final organizing schema was:

- Vol. I. Introductory Orientations
- Vol. II. History of Scientific Thought
- Vol. III. Mathematics and the Sciences of the Heavens and Earth
- Vol. IV. Physics and Physical Technology
- Vol. V. Chemistry and Chemical Technology
- Vol. VI. Biology and Biological Technology
- Vol. VII. The Social Background

See Science and Civilisation in China for a full list.

The project is still proceeding under the guidance of the Publications Board of the Needham Research Institute, directed by Professor Mei Jianjun.

=== UNESCO ===
Needham, along with colleague Julian Huxley, was one of the founders of the United Nations Educational, Scientific, and Cultural Organization (UNESCO). Developed in 1945 with the help of Allied governments, UNESCO is an international organization that aims to bring education to regions that had been affected by Nazi occupation. Needham and Huxley advocated the growth of scientific education as a means to overcome political conflict and hence founded UNESCO in an effort to expand its influence. Composed of representatives from various Allied countries, UNESCO operated on the principle that ideas and information should spread freely among nations. However, Needham disagreed with this initial mode of exchange because of its failure to include nations outside of Europe and America.

To communicate his discordance with the model, Needham wrote and distributed a formal message to others in the organization explaining its flaws. He stated that nations outside of the European-American "bright zone", or primary location of scientific advancement, needed the help of international education the most. He also argued that the lack of familiarity between other nations and those in the bright zone made ideological exchange difficult. Finally, he expressed the notion that other countries had issues disseminating knowledge because they lacked the capital necessary for distribution. Due to these constraints, Needham suggested that most of the organization's support should be given to the "periphery" nations that lie outside of the bright zone.

In addition to supporting periphery nations, Needham incorporated his desire for a non-Eurocentric record of science in UNESCO's mission. To this end, Huxley and Needham devised an ambitious scholarly project they called The History of Scientific and Cultural Development of Mankind (shortened to History of Mankind). The goal of this project was to write a non-ethnocentric account of scientific and cultural history; it aimed to synthesize the contributions, perspectives, and development of oriental nations in the East in a way that was complementary to the Western scientific tradition. This vision was partly influenced by the political climate of the time of its planning in the late 1940s - the "East" and "West" were seen as cultural and political opposites. Working from the belief that science was the universal experience that bound humanity, Huxley and Needham hoped that their project would help ease some of the animosity between the two spheres. The project involved hundreds of scholars from around the globe and took over a decade to reach fruition in 1966. The work is still continued today with new volumes published periodically.

=== The Needham Question ===
In The Grand Titration, published 1969, Needham posited what became known as "The Needham Question" or "The Needham Puzzle" – namely, why had China been overtaken by the West in science and technology, despite their earlier successes? In Needham's words, "Why did modern science, the mathematization of hypotheses about Nature, with all its implications for advanced technology, take its meteoric rise only in the West", and "had not developed in Chinese civilization" which, in the previous many centuries "was much more efficient than occidental in applying" natural knowledge to practical needs.

Francis Bacon considered four inventions as completely transforming the modern world, marking it off from the antiquity of the Middle Ages: paper and printing, gunpowder, and the magnetic compass. He regarded the origins of these inventions as 'obscure and inglorious', dying without ever knowing that all of them were Chinese. Part of Needham's work attempts to "put this record straight".

Needham's works attribute significant weight to the impact of Confucianism and Taoism on the pace of Chinese scientific discovery, and emphasises the "diffusionist" approach of Chinese science as opposed to a perceived independent inventiveness in the western world

His own research revealed a steady accumulation of scientific results throughout Chinese history. In the final volume he suggests "A continuing general and scientific progress manifested itself in traditional Chinese society but this was violently overtaken by the exponential growth of modern science after the Renaissance in Europe. China was homeostatic, but never stagnant."

Needham himself concluded the rise of the bourgeoisie in Western Europe from the 15th century onwards to be one of the most important factors in answering the question, and he links the rise of capitalism to the development of the scientific method and the subsequent Industrial Revolution. Needham also concluded that the nature of Chinese script with its thousands of individual characters constrained the ability of the 11th century Chinese invention of moveable type printing to contribute to the wider dissemination of knowledge. When, together with the invention of paper, these technologies reached Europe, the higher speed and lower cost of printing in alphabetical languages with limited number of characters enabled an increase in the availability of knowledge at lower levels of society and the speed of its dissemination, accelerating progress.

Nathan Sivin, one of Needham's collaborators, while agreeing that Needham's achievement was monumental, suggested that the "Needham question", as a counterfactual hypothesis, did not have a useful answer:

It is striking that this question – Why didn't the Chinese beat Europeans to the Scientific Revolution? – happens to be one of the few questions that people often ask in public places about why something didn't happen in history. It is analogous to the question of why your name did not appear on page 3 of today's newspaper.

Yingqiu Liu and Chunjiang Liu argued that the issue rested on the minimal property rights available in the Chinese Empire, which were only obtainable through favour of the emperor and could be rescinded at any time. Innovations in science and technology were often appropriated by the government and their applications were governed by the immediate needs of the feudal royal family. The same feudal system was maintained through successive dynasties, with land and property reallocated first and foremost to the royal family of the new dynasty following a revolution. This continued up until the late Qing Dynasty (1644–1911) when fiefdom land was taken over by warlords and merchants. Liu and Liu argue that potential scientific innovations were therefore constrained by these limited property rights.

A related proposed explanation is that the Chinese Empire enacted totalitarian control and was able to do so because of its great size. There were smaller independent states that had no choice but to comply with this control, since they could not afford to isolate themselves. The Chinese believed in the well-being of the state as their primary motive for economic activity, and individual initiatives were shunned. There were regulations on the press, clothing, construction, music, birth rates, and trade. The Chinese state controlled all aspects of life, severely limiting any incentives to innovate and to better one's self. "The ingenuity and inventiveness of the Chinese would no doubt have enriched China further and probably brought it to the threshold of modern industry, had it not been for this stifling state control. It is the State that kills technological progress in China". Meanwhile, the lack of a free market in China escalated to a new affair whereby the Chinese were restricted from carrying trade with foreigners. Foreign trade is a great source of foreign knowledge as well as the capability of acquisition of new products. Foreign trade promotes innovation as well as the expansion of a country's market. As Landes (2006) further puts it, in 1368 when the new emperor Hongwu was inaugurated, his main objective was war. (p. 6). A lot of revenue that can otherwise be used for innovative procedures are as a result lost in wars. Heavy participation in war significantly hindered the Chinese to have the capability of focusing on the industrial revolution. Landes (2006) further explains that Chinese were advised to stay put and never to move without permission from the Chinese state. As illustrated, "The Ming code of core laws also sought to block social mobility" (Landes, 2006, p. 7).

According to Justin Lin, China did not make the shift from an experience-based technological invention process to an experiment-based innovation process. The experience-based process depended on the size of a population, and while new technologies have come about through the trials and errors of the peasants and artisans, experiment-based processes surpasses experience-based processes in yielding new technology. Progress from experimentation following the logic of a scientific method can occur at a much faster rate because the inventor can perform many trials during the same production period under a controlled environment. Results from experimentation is dependent on the stock of scientific knowledge while results from experience-based processes is tied directly to the size of a population; hence, experiment-based innovation processes have a higher likelihood of producing better technology as human capital grows. China had about twice the population of Europe until the 13th century and so had a higher probability of creating new technologies. After the 14th century, China's population grew exponentially, but progress in innovation saw diminishing returns. Europe had a smaller population but began to integrate science and technology that arose from the scientific revolution in the 17th century. This scientific revolution gave Europe a comparative advantage in developing technology in modern times.

=== Evaluations and critiques ===
Needham's work has been criticised by many scholars who assert that it has a strong inclination to exaggerate Chinese technological achievements and has an excessive propensity to assume a Chinese origin for the wide range of objects his work covered. Pierre-Yves Manguin writes, for instance:

J Needham's (1971) monumental work on Chinese nautics offers by far the most scholarly synthesis on the subjects of Chinese shipbuilding and navigation. His propensity to view the Chinese as the initiators of all things and his constant references to the superiority of Chinese over the rest of the world's techniques does at times detract from his argument.

In another vein of criticism, Andre Gunder Frank's Re-Orient argues that despite Needham's contributions in the field of Chinese technological history, he still struggled to break free from his preconceived notions of European exceptionalism. In Frank's view, he retains Eurocentric assumptions borrowed from Marx and wrongly presupposes that science was a uniquely Western phenomenon. Frank states:

Alas, it was also originally Needham's Marxist and Weberian point of departure. As Needham found more and more evidence about science and technology in China, he struggled to liberate himself from his Eurocentric original sin, which he had inherited directly from Marx, as Cohen also observes. But Needham never quite succeeded, perhaps because his concentration on China prevented him from sufficiently revising his still ethnocentric view of Europe itself.

T. H. Barrett asserts in The Woman Who Discovered Printing that Needham was unduly critical of Buddhism, describing it as having 'tragically played a part in strangling the growth of Chinese science,' to which Needham readily conceded in a conversation a few years later. Barrett also criticizes Needham's favoritism and uncritical evaluation of Taoism in Chinese technological history:

He had a tendency — not entirely justified in the light of more recent research — to think well of Taoism, because he saw it as playing a part that could not be found elsewhere in Chinese civilization. The mainstream school of thinking of the bureaucratic Chinese elite, or 'Confucianism' (another problematic term) in his vocabulary, seemed to him to be less interested in science and technology, and to have 'turned its face away from Nature.' Ironically, the dynasty that apparently turned away from printing from 706 till its demise in 907 was as Taoist as any in Chinese history, though perhaps its 'state Taoism' would have seemed a corrupt and inauthentic business to Needham.

Daiwie Fu, in the essay "On Mengxi bitan's World of Marginalities and 'South-pointing Needles': Fragment Translation vs. Contextual Tradition", criticises Needham, among other Western scholars, for translations that select fragments deemed “scientific,” usually without appreciating the unity of the text, the context of the quotation, and taxonomy in which those fragments are embedded, then reorganize and reinterpret them in a new, Western taxonomy and narrative. Needham used this process of selection and re-assembly to argue for a Chinese tradition of science that did not exist as such.

Justin Lin argues against Needham's premise that China's early adoption of modern socioeconomic institutions contributed heavily to its technological advancement. Lin contends that technological advancements at this time were largely separate from economic circumstance, and that the effects of these institutions on technological advancement were indirect.

=== Political involvement ===
From the 1920s onward, Needham read Marx and supported various left-wing causes, but he never joined an official communist organization. However, when asked if he considered himself a Maoist, Needham stated "Yes, I certainly think so in some sense," and added that he in fact viewed Maoism as "a form of religion as well as a political system." His political views were based in a form of Christian socialism and incorporated a wide range of influences, ranging from evolutionary theory to traditional Chinese philosophy. He was influenced by Louis Rapkine and Liliana Lubińska, both Marxists brought up with a Jewish anti-clerical outlook. His political views precede his interest in the scientific advancements in China and did not seem to significantly change over the course of his research.

During his stay in China, Needham was asked to analyse some cattle cakes that had been scattered by American aircraft in the south of China at the end of World War II, and found they were impregnated with anthrax. During the Korean War he made further accusations that the Americans had used biological warfare. Zhou Enlai coordinated an international campaign to enlist Needham for a study commission, tacitly offering access to materials and contacts in China needed for his then early research. Needham agreed to be an inspector in North Korea and his report supported the allegations (it is debated to this very day whether the evidence had been planted as a part of a complicated disinformation campaign). Needham's biographer Simon Winchester claimed that "Needham was intellectually in love with communism; and yet communist spymasters and agents, it turned out, had pitilessly duped him." Needham was blacklisted by the US government until well into the 1970s.

In 1965, with Derek Bryan, a retired diplomat whom he first met in China, Needham established the Society for Anglo-Chinese Understanding, which for some years provided the only way for British subjects to visit the People's Republic of China. On a visit to China in 1964 he was met by Zhou Enlai, and in 1965 stated that "China has a better government now than for centuries", but on a visit in 1972 he was deeply depressed by the changes under the Cultural Revolution.

== Personal life ==
Needham married the biochemist Dorothy Moyle (1896–1987) in 1924 and they became the first husband and wife both to be elected as Fellows of the Royal Society. Simon Winchester notes that, in his younger days, Needham was an avid gymnosophist and he was always attracted by pretty women. When he and Lu Gwei-djen met in 1937, they fell deeply in love, which Dorothy accepted. The three of them eventually lived contentedly on the same road in Cambridge for many years. In 1989, two years after Dorothy's death, Needham married Lu, who died two years later. He suffered from Parkinson's disease from 1982, and died at the age of 94 at his Cambridge home. In 2008, the Chair of Chinese in the University of Cambridge, a post never awarded to Needham, was endowed in his honour as the Joseph Needham Professorship of Chinese History, Science and Civilisation. Since 2016, an annual Needham Memorial Lecture is held at Clare College.

Needham was a high church Anglo-Catholic who worshipped regularly at Ely Cathedral and in the college chapel, but he also described himself as an "honorary Taoist".

=== Morris dance ===
In 1929, Needham took up morris dancing with the Cambridge Morris Men and soon became a skilled dancer and accordion-player. He became a full member of the Cambridge Morris Men in 1931, and the society's squire in 1933, and was one of the main instigators of the formation of the Morris Ring in 1934. In 1941 he resumed his role as squire for the Cambridge Morris.

As a researcher, Needham wrote two important articles for the Journal of the English Folk Dance and Song Society. The first was his 1933 article on the Cambridgeshire tradition of molly dance written with his friend Arthur Peck. The second, on the "Geographical Distribution of English Ceremonial Dances", catalogued three hundred locations where traditional dance had survived, and was the foundation of important later scholarship by Alex Helm, E. C. Cawte, Roger Marriott, and Norman Peacock.

== Honours and awards ==
In 1961, Needham was awarded the George Sarton Medal by the History of Science Society and in 1966 he became Master of Gonville and Caius College. In 1979, Joseph Needham received the Dexter Award for Outstanding Achievement in the History of Chemistry from the American Chemical Society. In 1984, Needham became the fourth recipient of the J.D. Bernal Award, awarded by the Society for Social Studies of Science. In 1990, he was awarded the Fukuoka Asian Culture Prize by Fukuoka City.

The Needham Research Institute in Robinson College in Cambridge, devoted to the study of China's scientific history, was opened in 1985 by Prince Philip, Duke of Edinburgh and Chancellor of Cambridge University.

- Order of the Companions of Honour, 1992.
- British Academy, 1971.
- Royal Society, 1941.

== Works ==
- Science, Religion and Reality (1925)
- Man a Machine (1927) Kegan Paul
- Chemical Embryology (1931) C.U.P.
- The Great Amphibium: Four Lectures on the Position of Religion in a World Dominated by Science (1931)
- A History of Embryology (1934, 1959) C.U.P.
- Order and Life The Terry Lectures (1936)
- Biochemistry and Morphogenesis (1942)
- Time: The Refreshing River (Essays and Addresses, 1932–1942) (1943)
- Chinese Science (1945) Pilot Press
- History Is On Our Side (1947)
- Science Outpost; Papers of the Sino-British Science Co-Operation Office (British Council Scientific Office in China) 1942–1946 (1948) Pilot Press
- Science and Civilisation in China (1954–2008...) C.U.P. – 27 volumes to date
- The Grand Titration: Science and Society in East and West (1969) Allen & Unwin
- Within the Four Seas: The Dialogue of East and West (1969)
- Clerks and Craftsmen in China and the West: Lectures and Addresses on the History of Science and Technology (1970) C.U.P.
- Chinese Science: Explorations of an Ancient Tradition (1973) Ed. Shigeru Nakayama, Nathan Sivin. Cambridge : MIT Press
- Moulds of Understanding: A Pattern of Natural Philosophy (1976) Allen & Unwin
- The Shorter Science and Civilisation in China (5 volumes) (1980–95) – an abridgement by Colin Ronan
- Science in Traditional China : A Comparative Perspective (1982)
- The Genius of China (1986) A one-volume distillation by Robert Temple Simon & Schuster
- Heavenly Clockwork : The Great Astronomical Clocks of Medieval China (1986) C.U.P.
- The Hall of Heavenly Records : Korean Astronomical Instruments and Clocks, 1380–1780 (1986) C.U.P.
- A Selection from the Writings of Joseph Needham ed Mansel Davies, The Book Guild 1990

== See also ==
- Four Great Inventions
- G. E. R. Lloyd
- List of sinologists
- List of historians
- The Rise of the West

Academic offices
Preceded by Sir Nevill Francis Mott	Master of Gonville and Caius College; 1966–1976	Succeeded by Sir William Wade
