= Dorothy M. Needham =

English biochemist (1896–1987)

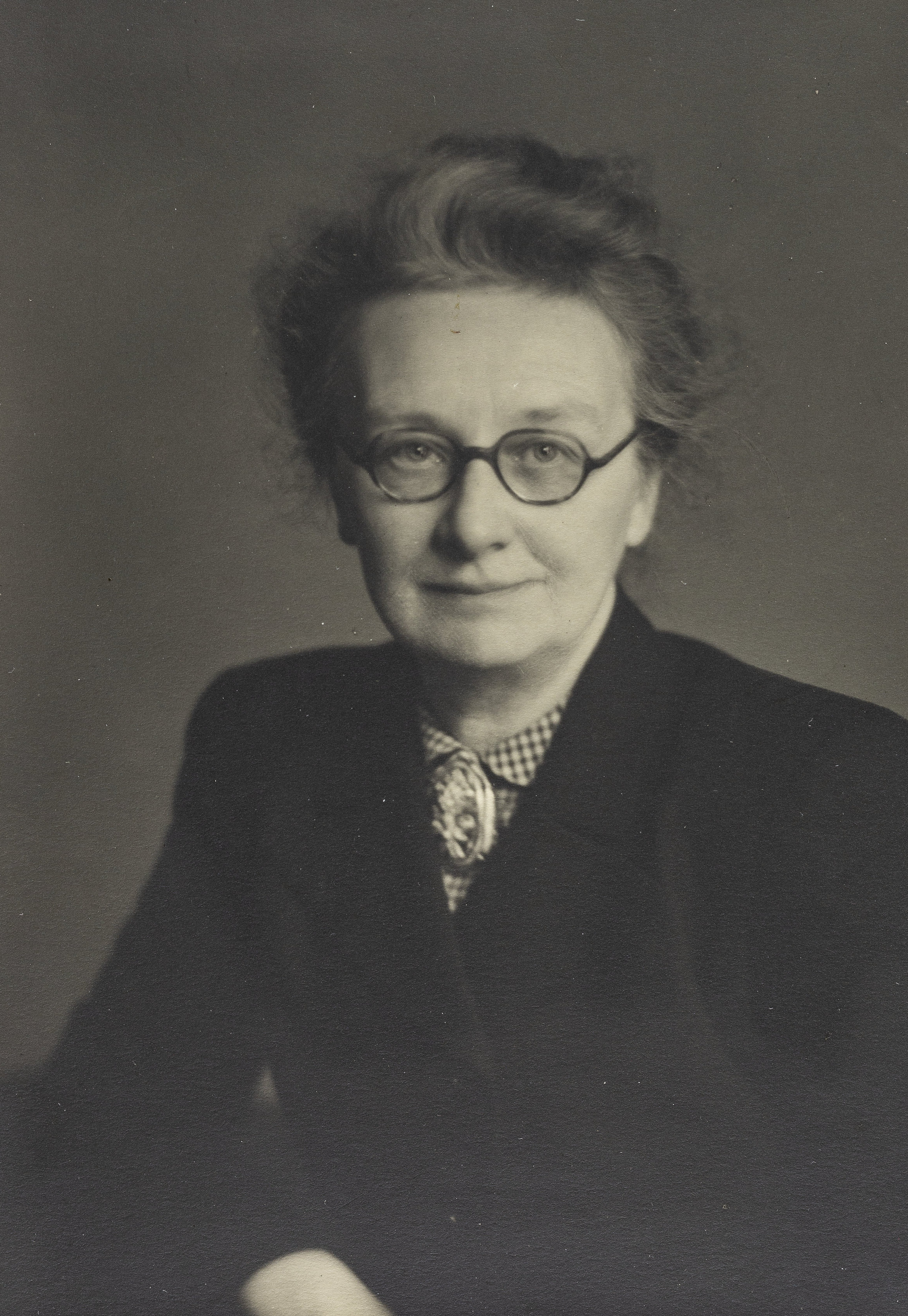
- Born: Dorothy Mary Moyle; 22 September 1896; London
- Died: 22 December 1987 (aged 91)
- Education: St Hilary's School, Alderley Edge, Girton College, Cambridge
- Occupation: Biochemist
- Known for: biochemistry of muscle
- Spouse: Joseph Needham

Dorothy Mary Moyle Needham FRS (22 September 1896 – 22 December 1987) was an English biochemist known for her work on the biochemistry of muscle. She was married to biochemist Joseph Needham.

== Early life and education ==
Dorothy Mary Moyle was born in London, to patent clerk John Thomas Moyle and his wife, Ellen Daves. She attended Claremont College, Stockport, an institution run by her aunt, Agnes Daves, and St Hilary's School, Alderley Edge, before entering Girton College, Cambridge. At Girton she became interested in chemistry, and biochemistry in particular after attending the lectures of Frederick Gowland Hopkins. After completing undergraduate studies in 1919, in which she obtained a 3rd Class Honours, she was offered a research position with Hopkins—one of the few scientific leaders at Cambridge at the time who offered research opportunities for women—at the Sir William Dunn Institute of Biochemistry, Cambridge, She earned a Master of Arts in 1923, and a PhD in 1930.

== Career ==
Moyle's first major research, in collaboration with Dorothy L. Foster, focused on the interconversion of lactic acid and glycogen in muscle, recapitulating the work of Otto Fritz Meyerhof. After that, she studied the roles of succinic acid, fumaric acid, and malic acid in muscle metabolism, as well as the biochemical differences and relationships between aerobic and anaerobic pathways. She subsequently worked on cyclic phosphate transfer in muscle contraction and, with collaborators, established for the first time a direct correlation of structure and function in muscle by confirming in 1939 that myosin, the contractile protein of muscle, behaves as the enzyme ATPase (adenosine triphosphatase).

During World War II, Needham participated in research as a member of the chemical defence group led by Professor Malcolm Dixon for the Ministry of Supply, focussing on the effects of chemical weapons (especially mustard gas) on skin and bone-marrow metabolism.

In 1944, her husband was appointed scientific counsellor at the British embassy in Chungking (Chongqing), China, and Needham accompanied him to China where she was appointed associate director of the Sino-British co-operation office that he established there. They returned to Cambridge in 1945, where she continued research in protein and enzyme biochemistry, and she was awarded the degree of Doctor of Science. In 1948, she was elected as a Fellow of the Royal Society (FRS), making the Needhams the Royal Society's first married couple.

In 1962, she concluded her four decades of research in muscle biochemistry with a study of the proteins of smooth muscle in the uterus.

Her major work: Machina Carnis: The Biochemistry of Muscular Contraction in its Historical Development which traces all the developments in the field since 1600, was published in 1971 and reissued in paperback in 2009.

She was an honorary fellow of Girton College, a co-founder and fellow of Lucy Cavendish College, and an honorary fellow of Caius College, where she was the first (and for a long time the only) woman fellow.

== Personal life and political activities ==
On 13 September 1924 Moyle married fellow biochemist (Noel) Joseph Terence Montgomery Needham. The couple had no children.

The Needhams were a socially and politically active couple who shared many causes—for example, both sat on the Cambridge Trade Council as representatives of the Association of Scientific Workers. Dorothy stood as a Labour Party candidate for Cambridge City Council. She supported numerous organisations, including Amnesty International; Animals' Vigilantes; Anti-Nuclear Campaign; Cambridge Welfare and Preservation Societies; Cambridge University's Newcomers Club; El Salvador Committee for Human Rights; Friends of the Earth; Medical and Scientific Aid for Vietnam, Laos and Kampuchea; Medical and Scientific Committee for Soviet Jewry; and the Movement for the Ordination of Women. She also helped to found two new colleges at Cambridge University for research women who had no college appointments: New Hall in 1946, and Lucy Cavendish College in 1962.
