= Needham Research Institute =

Research centre in Cambridge, England

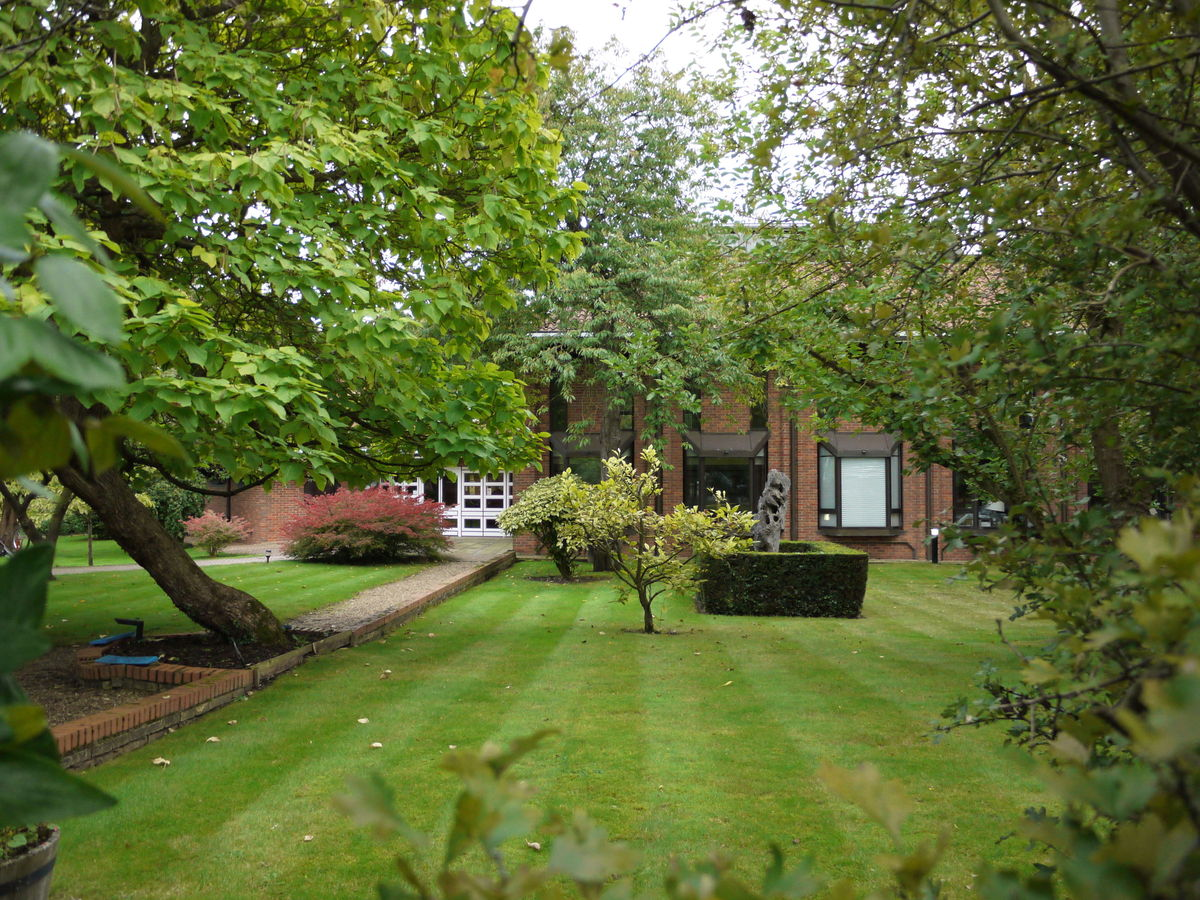
- Address: 8 Sylvester Road, Cambridge CB3 9AF, England
- Location: Cambridge, United Kingdom
- Coordinates: 52.2050°N 0.1018°E
- Interactive map of Needham Research Institute
- Website: http://www.nri.cam.ac.uk/index.html

The Needham Research Institute (NRI; Chinese: 李約瑟研究所), located on the grounds of Robinson College, in Cambridge, England, is a centre for research into the history of science, technology and medicine in East Asia. The institute is named after the biochemist and historian Joseph Needham, who initiated the Science and Civilisation in China series. The current director is Mei Jianjun, a noted archaeo-metallurgist.

The organization was founded as the East Asian History of Science Trust in August 1968. In June 1983 the trustees conferred the title Needham Research Institute. The Trustees of the NRI is a registered charity.

The institute grew out of Needham's research collection, which was originally housed in Gonville and Caius College, where he was Master until his retirement in 1976. After several moves, it moved into its current purpose-built structure in Robinson College in 1991. The building was designed in the Chinese style, and has been described by its architect as "East Anglian Asian".

== List of directors ==
1. Joseph Needham 1983-1990
2. Ho Peng Yoke February 1990-2001
3. Christopher Cullen October 2003-December 2013
4. Mei Jianjun January 2014-
