= Wang Ling (historian) =

Australian historian and sinologist

Wang Ling (simplified Chinese: 王铃; traditional Chinese: 王鈴, 1918–1994) was a Chinese historian and sinologist. He was known for his collaboration with Joseph Needham on the history of science and technology in China.

== Biography ==
Wang Ling was born in Nantong, China, and graduated in history from National Central University (Nanjing University), which had moved from Nanjing to Chongqing during the Sino-Japanese War. In 1943, while working as a junior researcher at the Academia Sinica's Institute of History and Philology in Lizhuang, Wang met Needham, a British biochemist who had been sent by the Royal Society and British Government to head the Sino-British Science Cooperation Office, whose mission was to assist the universities of China.

Needham had already conceived a plan for a book on the history of Chinese scientific and technological achievement, which was generally little known and appreciated in the West at that time, and recruited Wang as his chief researcher and first collaborator on the project. Science and Civilisation in China subsequently grew to many volumes and changed educated and popular views of China in the West; it is regarded as one of the world's pre-eminent investigations of Chinese civilisation.

From 1948 to 1958 Wang worked on the project with Needham at Cambridge University, along the way obtaining his doctorate at Trinity College, Cambridge on the history of Chinese mathematics in the Han Dynasty. In 1958 he left Cambridge to take up a position as lecturer in Chinese at Canberra University College, later the faculty of Asian studies at the Australian National University.

He was a professorial fellow at the Department of Far Eastern History in the Research School of Pacific and Asian Studies (RSPAS) at Australian National University from 1963 to 1983. In 1992 Wang Ling returned to Nantong, where he lived until his death in June 1994.

== Publications ==
- 1954. Science and Civilisation in China. Vol. 1. Introductory Orientations. Joseph Needham, with W.L. Cambridge University Press
- 1956. Science and Civilisation in China. Vol. 2. History of Scientific Thought. Joseph Needham, with W.L.
- 1959. Science and Civilisation in China. Vol. 3. Mathematics and the Sciences of the Heavens and Earth. Joseph Needham, with W.L.
- 1960. Heavenly Clockwork: The Great Astronomical Clocks of Medieval China. Joseph Needham, W.L. and Derek J. de Solla Price
- 1962. Science and Civilisation in China. Vol. 4, Part 1. Physics. Joseph Needham, with W.L. and Kenneth Robinson.
- 1965. Science and Civilisation in China. Vol. 4, Part 2. Mechanical Engineering. Joseph Needham, with W.L.
- 1970. Clerks and Craftsmen in China and the West: Lectures and Addresses on the History of Science and Technology. Joseph Needham, W.L., Lu Gwei-Djen, and Ho Ping-Yü
- 1971. Science and Civilisation in China. Vol. 4, Part 3. Civil Engineering and Nautics. Joseph Needham, with W.L. and Lu Gwei-Djen.
- 1987. Science and Civilisation in China. Vol. 5, Part 7. Military Technology: The Gunpowder Epic. Joseph Needham, with Ho Ping-Yü [Ho Peng-Yoke], Lu Gwei-djen and W.L.
- 1994. Science and Civilisation in China. Vol. 5, Part 6. Military Technology: Missiles and Sieges. Joseph Needham, Robin D. S. Yates, with Krzysztof Gawlikowski, Edward McEwen and W.L.
